= 1977 Silver Jubilee and Birthday Honours =

British government recognitions

The 1977 Silver Jubilee and Birthday Honours were announced on 11 June 1977 to celebrate Queen Elizabeth II's Silver Jubilee and Birthday in the United Kingdom, Canada, Australia, New Zealand, Barbados, Mauritius, Fiji, the Bahamas, Grenada, and Papua New Guinea.

The Queen's Birthday Honours are announced on or around the date of the Queen's Official Birthday in Australia, Canada, New Zealand and the United Kingdom. The dates vary, both from year to year and from country to country. All are published in supplements to the London Gazette and many are conferred by the monarch (or her representative) some time after the date of the announcement, particularly for those service people on active duty.

The recipients of honours are displayed here as they were styled before their new honour, and arranged by honour, with classes (Knight, Knight Grand Cross, etc.) and then divisions (Military, Civil, etc.) as appropriate.

== United Kingdom ==
=== Appointments ===
- Her Majesty The Queen to be Colonel-in-Chief the Corps of Royal Military Police, and Honorary Air Commodore Royal Air Force Marham.
- His Royal Highness The Duke of Edinburgh as Colonel-in-Chief Intelligence Corps and Honorary Air Commodore Royal Air Force Kinloss.
- His Royal Highness The Prince of Wales as Colonel-in-chief The Cheshire Regiment, The Gordon Highlanders, 2nd King Edward VII's Own Gurkha Rifles (The Sirmoor Rifles) and The Parachute Regiment, and Honorary Air Commodore Royal Air Force Brawdy.
- Her Royal Highness The Princess Anne, Mrs Mark Phillips, as Colonel-in-Chief Royal Corps of Signals, and Honorary Air Commodore Royal Air Force Lyneham.
- Her Royal Highness The Princess Margaret, Countess of Snowdon, to be Honorary Air Commodore Royal Air Force Coningsby.
- His Royal Highness The Duke of Gloucester as Colonel-in-Chief Royal Pioneer Corps and Honorary Colonel Royal Monmouthshire Royal Engineers (Militia).
- Her Royal Highness The Duchess of Gloucester as Colonel-in-Chief Royal Army Educational Corps.
- His Royal Highness The Duke of Kent as Colonel-in-Chief The Devonshire and Dorset Regiment.
- Her Royal Highness The Duchess of Kent as Colonel-in-Chief 4th/7th Royal Dragoon Guards.
- Her Royal Highness Princess Alexandra, The Honourable Mrs. Angus Ogilvy, as Colonel-in-Chief The King's Own Royal Border Regiment.

=== Life Peers ===
- The Right Honourable Philip John Noel-Baker, Member of Parliament for Coventry, 1929–1931; Derby 1936–1950; Derby South 1950–1970. Secretary of State for Air 1946–1947. Secretary of State for Commonwealth Relations 1947–1950. Minister of Fuel and Power 1950–1951.
- Field Marshal Sir Richard Michael Power Carver, GCB CBE DSO MC, lately Chief of the Defence Staff.
- Pratap Chidamber Chitnis, chief executive, The Joseph Rowntree Social Service Trust.
- Sir Eric Roll, KCMG CB, chairman, S. G. Warburg and Company Ltd. Director, Bank of England.
- Kenneth William Wedderburn, Cassel Professor of Commercial Law, London School of Economics and Political Science, University of London.

=== Privy Counsellors ===
- Peter Kingsley Archer, QC MP, Solicitor General. Member of Parliament for Warley West.
- Edward Stanley Bishop, MP, Minister of State, Ministry of Agriculture, Fisheries and Food. Member of Parliament for the Newark Division of Nottingham.
- Walter Harrison, MP, Treasurer of Her Majesty's Household. Member of Parliament for Wakefield.
- Sir Robert Michael Oldfield Havers, QC MP, Solicitor General 1972–1974. Member of Parliament for the Merton Division of Wimbledon.
- James Gregor Mackenzie, MP, Minister of State, Scottish Office, Member of Parliament for Rutherglen.
- Senator the Honourable Reginald Grieve Withers, Minister for Administrative Services and Vice-President of the Federal Executive Council, Commonwealth of Australia.

=== Knights Bachelor ===
- Major-General William Ernest Victor Abraham, CBE, lately National Chairman, Burma Star Association.
- Harold Winter Atcherley, chairman, Armed Forces' Pay Review Body.
- Sidney Charles Bacon, CB, managing director, Royal Ordnance Factories. For services to Export.
- George William Barlow, chairman and Chief Executive, Ransome Hoffmann Pollard Ltd.
- Norman Parris Biggs, lately chairman, Williams and Glyn's Bank Ltd.
- Kenneth Lyon Blaxter, FRS, Director, Rowett Research Institute, Aberdeen.
- John Brown Bolton, OBE. For public services in the Isle of Man.
- John William Buckley, chairman, Davy International Ltd. For services to Export.
- George Vernon Kennedy Burton, CBE, chairman, Fisons Ltd. For services to Export.
- George Adrian Hayhurst Cadbury, chairman, Cadbury Schweppes Ltd. For services to Export.
- John Wenman Crofton, Professor of Respiratory Diseases, University of Edinburgh.
- Alan Nugent Goring Dalton, CBE, deputy chairman, English China Clays Ltd. For services to Export.
- Christopher John Dewhurst, Professor of Obstetrics and Gynaecology, Queen Charlotte's Hospital for Women, London.
- William Atkinson Downward. For public services in Manchester.
- Alexander Charles Durie, CBE, Director General, The Automobile Association.
- Professor Idris Llewelyn Foster. For cultural services in Wales.
- Professor Frederick Charles Frank, OBE FRS, lately Professor of Physics, University of Bristol.
- Alexander Drummond Gibson, CBE. For services to music in Scotland.
- Peter Reginald Frederick Hall, CBE, Director, National Theatre.
- Raymond Evelyn Myles Humphreys, For public service in Belfast.
- Robert Brockie Hunter, MBE, Vice-Chancellor, University of Birmingham.
- Lieutenant-Colonel Henry Morton Llewellyn, CBE DL, chairman, Sports Council for Wales; President, British Equestrian Federation.
- Charles Francis Noel Murless. For services to Horse Racing.
- David Napley, President, Law Society.
- David Alexander Orr, MC, chairman, Unilever Ltd. For services to Export.
- Alan Guyatt Parks, Surgeon, London Hospital and St. Mark's Hospital.
- David Arthur Perris, MBE, chairman, West Midlands Regional Health Authority.
- Edward Davies Pickering, lately chairman, Mirror Group Newspapers.
- Francis Alan Pullinger, CBE, chairman, Haden Carrier Ltd. For services to Export.
- His Honour Judge Norman Grantham Lewis Richards, OBE QC, Circuit Judge.
- Rex Edward Richards, FRS. for services to nuclear magnetic resonance spectroscopy.
- Leslie Edward George Smith, chairman, British Oxygen Company International Ltd. For services to Export.
- David Edward Charles Steel, DSO MC TD, chairman, The British Petroleum Company Ltd.
- Professor Peter Frederick Strawson, FBA. For services to Philosophy.
- Charles Hugh Willis Troughton, CBE MC TD, chairman, British Council.
- David Valentine Willcocks, CBE MC, Director, Royal College of Music.
- Leonard Gordon Wolfson, chairman, Wolfson Foundation.
- Frederick Ambrose Stuart Wood, chairman, National Bus Company.

Diplomatic and Overseas List

- Sydney Douglas Gun-Munro, MBE, Governor of St. Vincent.
- Denis Eustace Gilbert Malone, Chief Justice of Belize.
- The Honourable John Henry Sharpe, CBE. For public services in Bermuda.
- Run Run Shaw, CBE. For public and community services in Hong Kong.
- Luther Reginald Wynter, CBE. For public services and services to medicine in Antigua.

Victoria, Australia

- Bernard James Callinan, CBE DSO MC, of Rew. For distinguished service to the State.
- Norman Cameron Coles, of Malvern. For distinguished service to commerce.

Queensland, Australia

- Edward Sholto Douglas, of Hamilton. For distinguished services as a member of the legal profession.
- David Walter Longland, CMG, of Camp Hill. For eminent services to the Crown and to the cerebral palsied.
- Edward Houghton Lyons, of Holland Park. For distinguished services in Australia's financial and commercial worlds.

Western Australia

- The Honourable Arthur Frederick Griffith, of Crawley. Lately President of the Legislative Council.
- The Honourable Ross Hutchinson, DFC, of Cottesloe. Lately Speaker of the Legislative Assembly.

=== Order of the Bath ===
==== Knight Grand Cross (GCB) ====
Military Division

Royal Navy

- Admiral Sir David Williams, KCB ADC.

Army

- Lieutenant General Sir David House, KCB CBE MC (203138), late The Royal Green Jackets, Colonel Commandant The Light Division, Colonel Commandant Small Arms School Corps.

Royal Air Force

- Air Chief Marshal Sir Douglas Lowe, KCB DFC AFC, Royal Air Force.

Civil Division

- Sir John Joseph Benedict Hunt, KCB, Secretary of the Cabinet.

==== Knight Commander (KCB) ====
Military Division

- Admiral Raymond Derek Lygo.
- Lieutenant General Anthony Heritage Farrar-Hockley, DSO MBE MC (251309), late The Parachute Regiment, Colonel Commandant The Prince of Wales' Division
- Lieutenant General Peter Hudson, CBE (330952), late The Royal Green Jackets.
- Air Marshal Robert William George Freer, CBE, Royal Air Force.
- Air Marshal William John Stacey, CBE, Royal Air Force.

Civil Division

- Peter Robert Baldwin, CB, Permanent Secretary, Department of Transport.
- Richard Douglas Barlas, CB OBE, Clerk of the House of Commons.
- Kenneth Barnes, CB, Permanent Secretary, Department of Employment.
- Brian Crossland Cubbon, CB, Permanent Secretary, Northern Ireland Office.
- Leo Pliatzky, CB, Second Permanent Secretary, HM Treasury.

==== Companion (CB) ====
Military Division

Royal Navy

- Rear Admiral William Noel Ash, MVO.
- Rear Admiral Gordon Walter Bridle, MBE
- Surgeon Rear Admiral (D) Albert Edward Cadman, QHDS.
- Major General Roderick Jarvis Ephraums, OBE, Royal Marines
- Rear Admiral Derek Graham Satow.

Army

- Major General Hugh Macdonald-Smith (324755), late Corps of Royal Electrical and Mechanical Engineers.
- Major General Giles Hallam Mills, CVO OBE (207511), late The Royal Green Jackets (now RARO).
- Major General John Humphrey Page, OBE MC (251684), late Corps of Royal Engineers.
- Major General Kenneth Perkins, MBE DFC (369841), late Royal Regiment of Artillery.
- Major General Peter Charles Shapland, MBE (320366), late Corps of Royal Engineers.
- Major General Patrick Anthony Macartan Tighe, MBE (261167), late Royal Corps of Signals.
- Major General David Tod Young, DFC (354597), Colonel The Royal Scots (The Royal Regiment).

Royal Air Force

- Air Vice-Marshal John Ivan Roy Bowring, CBE.
- Air Vice-Marshal George Colin Lamb, CBE AFC.
- Air Vice-Marshal Francis Richard Lee Mellersh, DFC, (Retired).
- Air Vice-Marshal Peter Greville Kaye Williamson, CBE DFC.
- The Venerable John Hewitt Wilson, QHC.

Civil Division

- Geoffrey Fraser Aronson, Legal Adviser, Ministry of Agriculture, Fisheries and Food.
- Thomas Terence Baird, Chief Medical Officer, Department of Health and Social Services, Northern Ireland.
- Edward Ussher Elliott Elliott-Binns, Under Secretary, Scottish Office.
- Frederick Howard Brooman, Under Secretary, Board of Inland Revenue.
- Miss Sheila Jeanne Browne, Senior Chief Inspector, Department of Education and Science.
- Thomas Ernest Ashdown Carr, Senior Principal Medical Officer, Department of Health and Social Security.
- Wallace Rodney Corrie, Under Secretary, Department of the Environment.
- Clifford Thomas Cross, Commissioner, Board of Customs and Excise.
- Rodger William Deans, Solicitor, Scottish Office.
- Constant Hendrik De Waal, Parliamentary Counsel.
- Robert Walker Gray, Deputy Secretary, Department of Trade.
- Geoffrey Hugh Green, Deputy Secretary, Ministry of Defence.
- Colonel Geoffrey Bridgman Grey, CBE TD DL, lately chairman, West Midland Territorial and Volunteer Reserve Association.
- Hugh Philip Johnston, Deputy Secretary, Department of the Environment.
- Cyril Desmond Evans Keeling, Secretary, Price Commission.
- Douglas McKean, Under Secretary, HM Treasury.
- Michael William Massy Osmond, Solicitor, Department of Health and Social Security.
- Hubert Scholes, Under Secretary, Department of Industry.
- Oliver Simpson, Chief Scientist, Home Office.
- William Stewart, Deputy Controller Aircraft, Ministry of Defence.
- Kenneth Ronald Stowe, Principal Private Secretary to the Prime Minister.
- Thomas Alan Whittington, Under Secretary, Lord Chancellor's Department.

=== Order of St Michael and St George ===
==== Knight Grand Cross (GCMG) ====
- Sir Nicholas Henderson, KCMG, HM Ambassador, Paris
- Sir Donald Maitland, CMG OBE, United Kingdom Permanent Representative to the European Communities, Brussels

==== Knight Commander (KCMG) ====
- Colin Hamilton Allan, CMG OBE, Governor, Solomon Islands
- Arthur Wilfred Bonsall, CBE, Director, Government Communications Headquarters
- John Archibald Ford, CMG, HM Ambassador, Jakarta
- Donald Arthur Logan, CMG, Leader of the United Kingdom Delegation to the United Nations Conference on the Law of the Sea
- Willie Morris, CMG, HM Ambassador, Cairo
- Norman Statham, CMG CVO, HM Ambassador, Brasilia
- The Honourable Francis Theodore Page Burt, Chief Justice of Western Australia.

==== Companion (CMG) ====
Military Division

- William James Caldow, Senior Technical Adviser, Ministry of Defence
- David Colin Humphreys, Under Secretary, Ministry of Defence

Civil Division

- Douglas Arthur Jordan, Assistant Secretary, Board of Customs and Excise
- Ronald Anthony Stuart Lane, MC, Vice Chairman, Standard Chartered Bank Ltd
- John Charles Rowley, Assistant Secretary, Ministry of Overseas Development

Diplomatic and Overseas List

- James Stanley Arthur, British High Commissioner, Suva
- William Bentley, HM Ambassador, Manila
- Keith Stephenson Butler, HM Consul-General, Naples
- Dudley St George Butterfield, chairman, Monetary Authority, Bermuda
- John Stuart Champion, OBE, British Resident Commissioner, New Hebrides Condominium
- Margaret Beryl, Mrs Chitty, Counsellor, Foreign and Commonwealth Office
- The Most Reverend Eusebius John Crawford, OP, DD, Bishop of Gizo, Solomon Islands
- Richard Stanley Faber, Assistant Under Secretary of State, Foreign and Commonwealth Office
- John Kyrle Hickman, Counsellor, HM Embassy, Dublin
- John Edward Jackson, HM Ambassador, Havana
- Peter Jordan, For services to medical research in St Lucia
- John Robert Neil Marshall, MBE, Adviser on Local Government Reforms, Cabinet Office, Lagos
- Theodore Xenophon Henry Pantcheff, Counsellor, Foreign and Commonwealth Office
- Robert Mark Russell, Counsellor, HM Embassy, Washington.
- Derek Morison David Thomas, Assistant Under-Secretary of State, Foreign arid Commonwealth Office
- Wilfred Turner, lately British Deputy High Commissioner, Accra
- Miss Anne Marion Warburton, CVO, HM Ambassador, Copenhagen
- Arthur Desmond Watts, Legal Counsellor, Office of the United Kingdom Permanent Representative to the European Communities, Brussels

Australian States
State of New South Wales

- The Most Reverend James Patrick Carroll. For services to the community.
- The Honourable Mr. Justice Rae Else-Mitchell. For services to the State and historical research.

State of Victoria

- The Right Reverend Donald Murray Macrae, of Kew. For distinguished services to the Presbyterian Church.

State of Queensland

- Arnold Henry Conrad, of St. Lucia. For services to the profession of architecture.

Western Australia

- Howard Vincent Reilly, OBE, of Peppermint Grove. For services to the development of the State and the well-being of its people.

=== Royal Victorian Order ===
==== Knight Grand Cross (GCVO) ====
- The Most Honourable George Hugh, Marquess of Cholmondeley, MC.

==== Dame Commander (DCVO) ====
- Henriette Alice, Lady Abel Smith, CVO.

==== Knight Commander (KCVO) ====
- Richard Philip Cave, CB MVO.
- Deputy Commissioner Colin Philip Joseph Woods, CBE, Metropolitan Police.

==== Commander (CVO) ====
- Hardy Amies.
- Ian Macdonald Campbell.
- Colonel Henry Nelson Clowes, DSO OBE.
- Harold Antony Craxton, MVO.
- Colonel Samuel Enderby, DSO MC.
- Miss Joan Lascelles.
- Archibald MacInnes.
- Royston John Mastel, CBE.
- Francis Kennedy Bryden Murdock, MVO MBE TD.
- Edward Ernest O'Farrell, CBE MVO.
- Geoffrey Arden Peacock.
- Edward Rayne.
- Colonel William Quincey Roberts, CBE DSO MVO TD.

==== Lieutenant (LVO) ====
- Dennis Frederick Boyt
- Alexander Colin Cole, TD.
- Geoffrey Harold Cross.
- Victor Dumbrell.
- Edna Ruth, Mrs. Gardner, MBE.
- Elizabeth Jon, Mrs. Grimsey.
- Lieutenant Colonel Charles Ronald Llewelyn Guthrie, Welsh Guards.
- Lieutenant Colonel Martin William Frederick Maxse, Coldstream Guards.
- Commander John Anthony May, Royal Navy.
- Brigadier The Honourable Richard Gustavus Hamilton-Russell, DSO.
- The Honourable Giles Rowan St. Aubyn.
- Ian Thomas.
- George Nisbet Waldram.
- Commander Robert Alan Worlidge, Royal Navy.

==== Member (MVO) ====
- Derek Risian Fenton, MBE.
- Reginald Arthur Gibbs.
- Miss Lucy Annora Gosling.
- Jeffrey Charles Jenkinson.
- Donald Fraser Mackenzie, MBE.
- Geoffrey Mussett.
- Joan Mary, Mrs. Neale.
- Frederick Charles Nutbeam.
- Roy Frederick Read.
- Flight Lieutenant Alan Leonard Venier.
- William Harold Watson.
- Miss Phyllis Edith Beatrice Watts.
- Carmel Magdalen Jeanne, Mrs. Wilkins.
- Cyril Raymond Woods.

==== Royal Victorian Medal ====
Gold

- Arthur Benjamin Benstead.
- Charles Gibson.
- Alfred Ernest Long.

Silver

- Police Constable Paul Francis Bell, Metropolitan Police.
- R1940313 Chief Technician Michael Hugh Caldicott, Royal Air Force.
- Alexander Callender, QGM.
- Chief Petty Officer Cook Elwyn Nigel Hurson Collier, M919745T.
- Bert Humphrey.
- Grenville Charles Jakeman.
- Isaac Little.
- B3527431 Chief Technician Barrie Charles Meech, Royal Air Force.
- Q4270144 Sergeant David Anthony Ovenden, Royal Air Force.
- Peter Ernest Page.
- Mary Ann Whitfield Pearce.
- Edwin Walter Penn.
- Reginald Leonard Renn.
- John Albert Reynolds.
- Edward Veniard.
- Robina Wilson.

=== Order of the British Empire ===
==== Dame Commander (DBE) ====
Civil Division

- Lady Moyra Blanche Madeleine Browne, OBE, Superintendent-in-Chief, St. John Ambulance Brigade.
- Alice Rosemary Murray, Vice-Chancellor, University of Cambridge.
- Winifred Eva Prentice OBE, lately president, Royal College of Nursing of the United Kingdom.
- Frances Amelia Yates, OBE FBA. For services to Renaissance studies.

State of Victoria, Australia

- Una Patricia, Mrs. Mackinnon, CBE, of Kooyong. For distinguished service to the Royal Children's Hospital.

==== Knight Commander (KBE) ====
Military Division

Royal Navy

- Vice Admiral Lancelot Richard Bell Davies.
- Rear Admiral William David Stewart Scott, CB.

Army

- Lieutenant General Richard Phillip Bradshaw, QHP. (371807), late Royal Army Medical Corps.

Civil Division

- The Right Honourable Basil William Sholto, Baron Amulree. For services to health and welfare.

State of Victoria, Australia

- Professor David Plumley Derham, CMG MBE, Vice-Chancellor of the University of Melbourne.
- The Most Reverend Dr. Thomas Francis Little, Roman Catholic Archbishop of Melbourne.

Diplomatic and Overseas List

- Air Commodore Arthur Dennis Mitchell, CVO DFC AFC, RAF (Retd.). For services to British commercial aviation interests in Belgium.
- John Vincent Prendergast, CMG OBE GM QPM CPM, lately Deputy Commissioner of Police, Hong Kong.

==== Commander (CBE) ====
Military Division

Royal Navy

- Captain Donald Gordon McLeod Averill, Royal Fleet Auxiliary Service.
- Colonel Patrick Griffiths, MC ADC, Royal Marines.
- Captain Maurice Robin Compton Howlett.
- Captain Keith Andre Leppard.
- Commodore Oliver Peter Sutton, ADC.
- Captain Kenneth Dilworth East Wilcockson.

Army

- Brigadier Ian Helstrip Baker, MBE, (393064), late Royal Tank Regiment.
- Brigadier Lawrence Peter Bennett (402241), late Corps of Royal Engineers.
- Colonel Keith Burch, MBE (418208), late The Royal Anglian Regiment.
- Colonel Douglas Cecil Coode (415359), late Corps of Royal Engineers, Territorial and Army Volunteer Reserve.
- Colonel John Barclay Evans (373290), late The Blues and Royals (Royal Horse Guards and 1st Dragoons).
- Colonel Kenneth William Ferrier, MBE (365602), late Royal Army Educational Corps.
- Colonel (Acting Brigadier) John Hamilton-Jones (357082), late Royal Regiment of Artillery.
- Colonel John Handley Pegg (412033), late Royal Regiment of Artillery.
- Brigadier David More Pontifex, OBE ADC (232590), late The Royal Green Jackets.

Royal Air Force

- Air Commodore Michael Gordon Beavis, OBE AFC.
- Air Commodore Basil Hamilton, OBE DFC AFC.
- Group Captain Gordon Harry Burgess.
- Group Captain Geoffrey John Barnes Claridge, OBE.
- Group Captain John Porter Wood.

Civil Division

- Arnold Millman Allen, Member for Finance & Administration, United Kingdom Atomic Energy Authority.
- The Most Honourable Elizabeth Shirley Vaughan, Marchioness of Anglesey. For public service in Wales.
- John Armour, Director of Roads, Strathclyde Regional Council.
- Reuben Aspinall, Deputy Chief Scientific Officer, Ministry of Defence.
- John Henry Roland Bailey, Director, Co-operative Wholesale Society.
- Richard John Bailey, managing director, Royal Doulton Tableware Ltd. For services to Export.
- Allan Joseph Baker. Headmaster, Wilsthorpe Secondary School, Long Eaton, Nottingham.
- Frederick Albert Baker, National Industrial Officer, General and Municipal Workers' Union.
- Belinda Joan Banham, chairman, Cornwall & Isles of Scilly Area Health Authority.
- Philip Gerald Barber, OBE TD, chairman, British Council for Aid to Refugees.
- Robert William Begg. For services to Art in Scotland.
- Richard Rodney Bennett, Composer.
- Walter Harold Isaac Bevan, Chief Executive & Secretary, English Industrial Estates Corporation.
- Charles Winn Birdsall, OBE, Director of Information, Civil Service Department.
- George Cranston Bogle, MBE. For services to the Periodical Publishers Association.
- David Marshall Bowick, Vice-chairman & Chief Executive (Railways), British Railways Board.
- Leslie Balfour Boyd, lately Courts Administrator, Central Criminal Court, Lord Chancellor's Department.
- Donald Arthur Colin Aydon Boyne, editorial director, The Architects' Journal and The Architectural Review.
- John Cecil Brown, chairman, Yorkshire Water Authority.
- Marjorie Alice Brown, Member, Birmingham City Council.
- John Robert Marcus Brumwell. For services to art and industrial design.
- Thomas Haydon Burleigh, lately chairman, Firth Brown Tools Ltd. For services to Export.
- Thomas Samuel Charles Busby, OBE. For services to the Royal British Legion.
- William Frederick Cartwright, DL. For public service in Wales.
- Michael William Clark, deputy chairman and Deputy Chief Executive, Plessey Co. Ltd. For services to Export.
- Frederick James Clay, OBE, Assistant Paymaster General.
- Vernon Coffee, Director, Thorn Electrical Industries Ltd. For services to Export.
- Claude Neville David Cole. For services to journalism.
- James William Donald Crane, HM Inspector of Constabulary.
- George Ernest Hillyer Creber, Leader, Devon County and Plymouth City Councils.
- Hugh Guy Cubitt, Lord Mayor, City of Westminster.
- Thomas Gordon Cullen, Townscape Consultant and Architectural Illustrator.
- Ronald Ian Currie FRSE, Director, Dunstaffnage Marine Research Laboratory, Scottish Marine Biological Association.
- Nicholas Davenport, Financial Correspondent of The Spectator.
- Edward Roderick Dew, chairman, Board of Management, The College of Law.
- John Clayton Doggett, Assistant Solicitor, Board of Inland Revenue.
- Antony Clifford Dornhorst, Professor of Medicine, St. George's Hospital Medical School, London.
- Professor John Alastair Dudgeon, MC TD DL, Consultant Microbiologist, Hospital for Sick Children, Great Ormond Street.
- Norman Alfred Dudley, Lucas Professor of Engineering Production, University of Birmingham.
- Frank Dunlop, Director, Young Vic Company.
- Joseph Dunning, Principal, Napier College of Commerce & Technology.
- Peter Elliott, Assistant Chief Engineer, Department of Transport.
- Alexander Haigh Fetherston, deputy chairman and Chief Executive, Berkshire International (UK) Ltd
- William Fieldhouse, chairman, Letraset International Ltd. For services to Export.
- Wilfred Leslie Fletcher. For services to the constructional steelwork industry.
- Frederick John French, lately chairman, Central Horticultural Committee, National Farmers' Union.
- Charles Raylton Gray, OBE, Member, National Savings Committee.
- David Gray, OBE QPM, HM Chief Inspector of Constabulary for Scotland.
- Betty Hall, Regional Nursing Officer, West Midlands Regional Health Authority.
- Ernest Hall, TD, President, UK Association of Frozen Food Producers.
- James Hann, managing director, Seaforth Maritime Ltd.
- James Hargreaves, lately chairman, Association of Metropolitan Authorities Police & Fire Services Committee.
- Gordon Howard Eliot Hodgkin, Painter.
- Thomas Frank Honess, chairman and Chief Executive, G.K.N. Sankey Ltd. For services to Export.
- Michael Eliot Howard, MC FBA, Military Historian.
- David Leslie Hughes, Professor of Veterinary Pathology, University of Liverpool.
- Albert Arthur Huish. For public service in South Glamorgan.
- Herbert Inman, Regional Administrator, Yorkshire Regional Health Authority.
- Thomas Alfred Ivey, lately Assistant Secretary, Ministry of Agriculture, Fisheries & Food.
- Richard Eric Gautrey Jeeps. For services to Rugby Football.
- David Jenkins, Librarian, National Library of Wales.
- Clifford Ralph Kay, General Medical Practitioner, Manchester.
- Ronald William John Keay, OBE, Executive Secretary, The Royal Society.
- John Robert Ruck-Keene, MBE TD, General Secretary, The Chemical Society.
- Vivian Langrish. For services to Music.
- Jean Eileen Lawrie. For services to the Medical Women's Federation.
- John Lee, Director, Scott Lithgow Ltd. For services to Export.
- Gordon Manns Lewis, Technical Director, Aero Division, Bristol, Rolls-Royce Ltd.
- John Clifford Lewis, lately Regional Controller, Department of Health and Social Security.
- Peter George Hornby Lewison, chairman, National Dock Labour Board.
- Peter Anthony Lingard, TD, chairman, East Midlands Electricity Board.
- Frederick John Lloyd, Director General, West Midlands Passenger Transport Executive.
- Lieutenant-Colonel John McCann, TD, lately vice-chairman, Northern Ireland Territorial & Volunteer Reserve Association.
- Peter Toland McAree McCann, lately Lord Provost, City of Glasgow.
- George Edwin McCoy, QFSM, Chief Fire Officer, South Yorkshire Fire Brigade.
- Robert William McDowall, OBE, Secretary, Royal Commission on Historical Monuments (England).
- William Makinson, managing director, National Research Development Corporation.
- Donald Jack Mann, chairman, Food, Drink & Tobacco Industry Training Board.
- Peter Michael Marland, Headmaster, Woodberry Down Comprehensive School, Hackney.
- John Millar, lately Lord Provost of Edinburgh.
- Air Commodore Frederick Moir Milligan, OBE AFC, Secretary, The Rayne Foundation.
- Philip Kenneth Charles Millins, Director, Edge Hill College of Higher Education.
- Hugh Leslie Mitchell, chairman, Sunderland Area Health Authority.
- Charles John Montgomery, Chief General Manager, Lloyds Bank Ltd.
- Geoffrey Ernest Moore, Director and Assistant to managing director, Vauxhall Motors Ltd.
- Charles James Moss, Director, National Institute of Agricultural Engineering, Silsoe.
- The Right Honourable Gerard Benedict Newe, OBE, chairman, Central Personal Social Services Advisory Committee for Northern Ireland.
- Claude Scott Nicol, TD, Physician, Department of Genito-Urinary Medicine, St. Thomas's Hospital, London.
- John Kenneth Owens, Director, National Council of Social Service.
- Frederick William Hilton Parker, chairman, Frederick Parker Ltd. For services to Export.
- Terence Parry, OBE, General Secretary, Fire Brigades Union. For services to the Health and Safety Commission.
- Francis Layton Perkins, DSC, lately chairman, Hogg Robinson Group Ltd.
- Professor George Richard Potter. For services to the Royal Commission on Historical Manuscripts.
- Anthony Malcolm Galliers-Pratt, chairman, F. Pratt Engineering Corporation Ltd.
- Michael Emanuel Reynolds, managing director, Spar UK Ltd. For services to the food trade.
- Joseph John Righton, Vice-chairman, Lucas (Industries) Ltd. For services to Export.
- Brian Norman Roger Rix, Actor/Manager. For services to the handicapped.
- Eirlys Rhiwen Cadwaladr Roberts, OBE (Mrs. Cullen), lately deputy director, Consumers' Association.
- Thomas Blackburn Roberts, TD, chairman, Liverpool Area Health Authority.
- James Gordon Robson, Professor of Anaesthetics, Royal Postgraduate Medical School.
- Denis Michael Hall Rooney, chairman and managing director, Balfour Beatty Ltd. For services to Export.
- Philip Sydney Ross, lately Assistant Secretary, Department of Energy.
- Harry Shaw Rowe, MBE, Foreign & Commonwealth Office.
- Roy Ernest Rowe, Director-General, Cement & Concrete Association.
- Elsie Rosemary Rue, Regional Medical Officer, Oxford Regional Health Authority.
- Christopher Nigel John Ryan, Chief Executive, Independent Television News.
- Eric Samuel, Forbes Professor of Medical Radiology, University of Edinburgh.
- Alan Frederick Shaw, chairman, Intervention Board for Agricultural Produce.
- Eric George Sibert, County Planning Officer, Surrey County Council.
- Raymond David Smart, Commercial Director, Glaxo Holdings Ltd. For services to Export.
- John Herbert Smith, deputy chairman, British Gas Corporation.
- Jeffrey Maurice Sterling, deputy chairman and Treasurer, London Celebrations Committee for The Queen's Silver Jubilee.
- Graham Robert Strachan, Group Managing Director, John Brown Engineering (Clydebank) Ltd. For services to Export.
- John Anthony Swire, chairman, John Swire & Sons Ltd.
- Charles James Taylor, MBE ED, Professor of Forestry, University of Edinburgh.
- James Topping, chairman, Visiting Committee, Cranfield Institute of Technology.
- Rayner Stephens Unwin, chairman, George Allen & Unwin Ltd.
- Samuel Dennis Walker, Assistant Secretary, Civil Service Department.
- Thomas Anthony Wells, lately Accountant Adviser, Monopolies and Mergers Commission.
- John Clifford West, Professor of Engineering, University of Sussex.
- Henry Hunter Wightman, Director of Works Services, Department of Finance, Northern Ireland.
- John Henry Wilkinson, Professor of Chemical Pathology, University of London and Charing Cross Hospital.
- Jean Ruth Eraser Wilks, lately Headmistress, King Edward VI High School, Birmingham.
- George Mervyn Williams, MC TD DL, chairman, Christie-Tyler Ltd.
- John Bentley Woodham, Chief Executive, Cleveland County Council.
- John Maxwell Wotherspoon, chairman, Singer Co. (UK) Ltd. For services to Export.
- Arthur Thomas Wright, lately Director of Exports, GEC Power Engineering Ltd. For services to Export.
- Jack Wrigley, Professor of Education, University of Reading.
- Kenneth Middleton Young, board member for Personnel and Industrial Relations, Post Office.

Diplomatic Service and Overseas List

- John Hardy Inglis Arkell. For services to British commercial interests in Switzerland.
- Kenneth George William Bartell. For services to British commercial interests in France.
- Ernest Alfred Blackwell, OBE. For services to the British community in Belgium.
- James Callender Edwin Campbell. For services to British commercial interests in Australia.
- Laurence James Evans, HM Consul-General, Barcelona.
- Marcus Felix Brudenell Fitch. For services to British cultural and academic interests in Greece.
- Thomas Gerad Peter Garner, Commissioner of Prisons, Hong Kong.
- William Ormonde Fraser Goldie. For services to British commercial interests in Sweden.
- Alfred Charles Hall, OBE, British Deputy High Commissioner, Madras.
- Francis Kennedy, MBE, HM Consul-General, Atlanta.
- Frank Laws Johnson. For services to the British community in Paris.
- Thomas Chun-yon-Lee, Director of Social Welfare, Hong Kong.
- Hugh Kenneth Howard Oxley, OBE. For services to British commercial interests in Belgium.
- Dick Hurst Pantlin, OBE. For services to British commercial interests in Belgium.
- John Shorter. For services to British commercial interests in Australia.
- The Reverend Canon Edward Eric Staples, OBE, Honorary Chaplain, HM Embassy, Helsinki.
- Francis Edgar Stock, OBE. For services to University education in Natal.
- Herbert Basil MacLeod Vose. For services to British commercial interests in Australia.
- Paul Weis, lately Adviser to the United Nations High Commissioner for Refugees, Geneva.
- Graham Wright Whitehead. For services to British commercial interests and the community in New York.
- Brigadier Barrington Wilson, DSO. For services to British ex-Servicemen and the British community in France.
- Brian Denis Wilson, Director of Urban Services, Hong Kong.

Australian States
State of New South Wales

- Alexander Carmichael. For services to commerce and the community.
- William Regis Colbourne. For services to the community.
- Audrie Lillian McLeod, MBE. For services to charity.
- The Honourable Roger Bede Nott. For services to the State.

State of Victoria

- Andrew Sheppard Grimwade, of Toorak. For services to the arts and community.
- Isi Joseph Leibler, of Caulfield. For services to the Jewish community.
- Charles Henry Rennie, of Kew. For services to banking and the community.

State of Queensland

- Olive Cecil Boland, of Rockhampton. For services to education and community affairs.
- Clifford John Neilson, Mayor of Bundaberg.

State of Western Australia

- Roy Halliday Henderson, of Floreat Park. For services to the community.

==== Officer (OBE) ====
Military Division

Royal Navy

- Commander George Critchett Chapman.
- Commander Kenneth Cook.
- Commander Keith Harold Dedman.
- Commander Patrick John Edwards.
- Commander Ronald David Ham.
- Commander (I) Peter William Hockley.
- Commander William Cliffe Hodgson.
- Commander Peter Ronie Lees.
- Surgeon Commander Alan McEwan.
- Commander John Alexander Neilson, DSC.
- Major (local Lieutenant Colonel) Paul John Neville, MVO, Royal Marines.
- Commander Michael Roberson.
- Commander Ralph Gordon Sheffield, VRD*, Royal Naval Reserve.
- Commander Derek Skevington Smith.
- Commander Ronald Sothcott, RD, Royal Naval Reserve.
- Commander Michael Roger Wilson.

Army

- Lieutenant Colonel (Acting) Horace Wesley Bailey (389989), Army Cadet Force, Territorial and Army Volunteer Reserve.
- Lieutenant Colonel (Acting Colonel) Brian Aubrey Barratt (426820), Royal Army Ordnance Corps.
- Lieutenant Colonel John Stanley Bennett (433055), Royal Regiment of Artillery.
- Lieutenant Colonel George Bryan Campbell, MBE (443412), The Royal Highland Fusiliers (Princess Margaret's Own Glasgow and Ayrshire Regiment).
- Lieutenant Colonel Alexander James Carter, TD (449451), Royal Monmouthshire Royal Engineers (Militia), Territorial and Army Volunteer Reserve.
- Lieutenant Colonel David Bryan Hall Colley, MBE (433082), Royal Corps of Transport.
- Lieutenant Colonel Alan Cedric Dexter (381296), Royal Corps of Signals.
- Lieutenant Colonel (Staff Quartermaster) Richard Else, MBE (472673), Royal Corps of Transport (Now RARO).
- Lieutenant Colonel John Ernest Michael Hughes, MBE (437092), Royal Regiment of Artillery.
- Lieutenant Colonel Anthony Showan Jeapes, MC (440051), The Devonshire and Dorset Regiment.
- Lieutenant Colonel Christopher Francis Jebens (424367), The Queen's Lancashire Regiment.
- Lieutenant Colonel David Norman Lowe (424841), The Green Howards (Alexandra, Princess of Wales's Own Yorkshire Regiment).
- Lieutenant Colonel Robert Vaughan Ockenden (430402), Royal Tank Regiment.
- Lieutenant Colonel Richard Kyffin Owen (414937), Royal Army Ordnance Corps.
- Lieutenant Colonel Peter Ian Palmer (443528), Royal Corps of Transport.
- Lieutenant Colonel Ronald Alan Preedy (439354), Royal Regiment of Artillery.
- Lieutenant Colonel Richard Henry Robinson, MBE (443738), The Royal Anglian Regiment.
- Lieutenant Colonel Ian Oliver John Sprackling (451321), Royal Corps of Signals.
- Lieutenant Colonel Charles Edward Wilkinson, TD (416143), The Worcestershire and Sherwood Foresters Regiment (29th/45th Foot), Territorial & Army Volunteer Reserve.
- Lieutenant Colonel (Acting Colonel) Thomas Gwyn Williams, MBE (424512), 14th/20th King's Hussars.

Royal Air Force

- Wing Commander Robert Seymour Beecham (2532304).
- Wing Commander John Joseph Cooper (152927).
- Wing Commander George Howard Cunnington (3033007).
- Wing Commander Ronald Maurice Dubock, AFC, (151108) (Retd).
- Wing Commander Hugh Lorimer (183601).
- Wing Commander George Alfred Lucas (2557836).
- Wing Commander James Morris (2620160).
- Wing Commander Alan Vernon Hall Palmer (575816).
- Wing Commander Colin Hutton Reineck (505504).
- Wing Commander Peter Forsey Rogers (3134401).
- Wing Commander Michael John Forsyth Shaw (607846).
- Wing Commander Frederick Alwyn Spencer (2301957).
- Wing Commander Robert Henry Wood (587922).
- Acting Wing Commander Dennis McHarrie (67672), Royal Air Force Volunteer Reserve (Training Branch).

Civil Division

- Margaret Kathleen Miller Aiken, lately Assistant Registrar, Principal Probate Registry, Supreme Court of Judicature, Northern Ireland.
- Catherine Avent, Careers Guidance Inspector, Inner London Education Authority.
- Francis Joseph Baker. For services to medical laboratory technology.
- Ronald Alonzo John Barker, Senior Principal, Lord Chancellor's Department.
- Michael Carl Hartnell-Beavis, Senior Principal Consultant, Yard Ltd.
- Frank Bennett, chairman, Bensons International Systems Ltd. For services to Export.
- Geoffrey Victor Berry, Consultant Secretary, Friends of the Lake District.
- Bernard Cecil Bishop, chairman, Joint Committee of Ophthalmic Opticians.
- Charles William Henry Blogg, Editor of Debates, House of Lords.
- Charles Henry Blyth, General Secretary, International Transport Workers' Federation.
- Martin Garneys Bond, MC, Chairman National Federation of Housing Associations. For services to the Peabody Trust.
- John Myles Bowen, vice-president, Exploration and Development, Billiton International Metals.
- Robert Paul Boyes, QPM, Chief Constable, North Yorkshire Police.
- Albert Richard Brannon, Chief Fire Officer, Cheshire Fire Brigade.
- Leonard William Brimley, Principal, Department of the Environment.
- Peter Stanley Britton, Plant Director, Mullard Ltd, Southampton. For services to Export.
- Robert Maurice Brodtman, chairman, London Borough of Camden Savings Committee.
- Louise Browne (Lillie Louise Liversidge), chairman, Yorkshire Regional Centre, Royal Academy of Dancing.
- William Drummond Buchanan, Consultant to Employment Medical Advisory Service, Department of Employment.
- John Albert Bulley, Headmaster, Hartland Comprehensive School, Worksop.
- Ernest William Bunker, chairman, Preston District Council for Community Relations.
- Ronald Nicholas George Burbridge, Project Manager, Grain Power Station, Central Electricity Generating Board.
- Lieutenant-Colonel Richard Geoffrey Burlingham, TD DL. For services to local government and the community in Worcestershire.
- Urban Thomson Burston, Divisional General Manager, Northumberland & Tyne Division, Northern Water Authority.
- Reginald Tredre Byford, Director, British Rubber Manufacturers' Association
- Ross Campbell, chairman, Road Transport Industry Training Board (Northern Ireland).
- Stuart John Carne, General Medical Practitioner, London.
- Thomas Dorian Robertson Carroll, DFC, lately Executive Director Engineering, Short Brothers & Harland, Belfast.
- Enda Casement, Medical Superintendent, Holywell Hospital, Antrim.
- David James Charley, chairman, Leeds & District Disablement Advisory Committee.
- David McClure Chesney, MBE, Assistant Chief Constable, Royal Ulster Constabulary.
- Ernest Clifford Chesney, Director Operations, Scottish Division, British Steel Corporation.
- Philip David Childs. For public services in Hampshire, particularly in the City of Portsmouth.
- George Hunter Clemitson, lately Controller of Administration, Northern Ireland Postal & Telecommunications Board, The Post Office.
- Ian Carlyle Clingan, Engineer-in-Chief, Trinity House, London.
- Edith Coates (Edith Mary Lloyd). For services to singing.
- Margaret May Collis, lately-Inspector of Education, Kent Local Education Authority.
- George Goodwin Connor, Marine Marketing Manager, Rolls-Royce Limited. For services to Export.
- Leonard James Connor, Superintending Architect, Department of Health & Social Security.
- Thomas Counter. For services to the Gas Industry.
- Eric James Crawley, executive director, Navy, Army and Air Force Institutes.
- Brian John Crichton, Past Honorary Chairman, Forestry Commission's Regional Advisory Committee for North Wales.
- Norman Emry Croucher. For services to disabled people.
- Esther Lilian Cryer, Headmistress, Gordano Comprehensive School, Bristol.
- Alfred Charles Curtis, Principal, Board of HM Customs & Excise.
- Eric William Cuthbert, Chief Civil Engineer, London Transport.
- Elphinstone Maitland Dalglish, Deputy Chief Constable, Strathclyde Police.
- Herbert Darnell, Director of Engineering, British Steel Corporation.
- Fred Davis. For services to Snooker.
- Campbell Douglas Deane, deputy director, Ulster Museum, Belfast.
- William George John Denness, Senior Principal, Department of Energy.
- Francis Wilfred Dennis, Export Manager, Temperature Ltd., London. For services to Export.
- Alexander Devlin, chairman, Education Committee, Fife Regional Council.
- Gilbert James Douel, lately chairman, Wolverhampton Young Volunteers.
- Walter Henry Dukes, Director of Works, Commonwealth War Graves Commission.
- Stanley Duncalf, Senior Principal, Department of Employment.
- Norman Rex Duncan, Vice Chairman, J. & E. Page Ltd. For services to the flower industry.
- Harry Philip Durant, lately General Manager, Sun Alliance & London Insurance Group.
- Alice Margaret Durbridge, lately Member, Milton Keynes Development Corporation.
- Donald George Durrant. For services to the community in Lowestoft.
- Victor Eric Emery, lately Secretary, American Chamber of Commerce (UK).
- William Christie Espie, Member (Regional Representative), National Savings Committee for Scotland.
- Philip Henry Rees Evans, chairman, Bournemouth National Insurance Local Tribunal.
- Thomas Myrddin Evans, President, Farmers' Union of Wales.
- The Right Honourable Cicely Elizabeth Joan, Baroness Evershed. For services to the King's Lynn Preservation Trust.
- James Francis Ezechiel, lately Senior Principal, Ministry of Defence.
- Douglas Melville Fielding. For services to the community in Sidcup.
- Rita Marian Finch, County Secretary, Northumberland Soldiers', Sailors' and Airmen's Families Association.
- Eric James Fitchett, Regional Pharmaceutical Officer, Trent Regional Health Authority.
- George Raymond Forrester, Chief Engineer, Materials, West Yorkshire Metropolitan County Council.
- Fred Frank Fox, managing director, Pasta Foods Ltd. For services to the food industry.
- George Fox, Principal, National Gallery.
- William Wright Fulton, General Medical Practitioner, Glasgow.
- Derrick James Gallagher, assistant director (Engineer), Support Command Signals Headquarters, Ministry of Defence.
- Edward Thomas William Galpin, lately General Manager (South), Portsmouth & Sunderland Newspapers
- James Galway, Flautist.
- Marjorie Grace Gardener, Principal Officer, Joint Board of Clinical Nursing Studies, London.
- Peter Gasper, Wing Representative Chairman, West Essex Wing, and chairman, 12F (Walthamstow) Squadron Committee, Air Training Corps.
- Frank Gibson, Vice-chairman, North Western Regional Health Authority.
- Victor Stanley Gilbert, Deputy Assistant Commissioner, Metropolitan Police.
- Derek Oliver Gladwin, Regional Secretary, Southern Region, General & Municipal Workers' Union.
- Martyn Goff, Director, National Book League.
- Maurice Thomas James Goff, lately Divisional Director, Renold For services to Export.
- Elsa Matilda Goldberg, lately Director of Research Unit, National Institute for Social Work.
- John Greenwood, Finance Director, Ocean Transport & Trading Ltd.
- Robert Elston Gregson, Controller, Overseas Services, British Broadcasting Corporation.
- Richard Henzell Grunwell, Senior Master, Hustler Comprehensive School, Middlesbrough.
- Frank Desmond Hall, MBE, Production Manager, Royal Shakespeare Company, Stratford-upon-Avon.
- Margaret Mary Hall, Principal, Department of the Environment.
- Frederick Hallworth, Director, Library and Museum Services, Wiltshire.
- Roy Meadows Harmston, managing director, Monmouthshire Building Society.
- Frederick Walter Hartley, Senior Staff Scientist, Electrical & Musical Industries Electronics
- Richard Harvey, Director, Appliance Testing Laboratories, Electricity Council.
- Jonathan Cordukes McKibbin Hayes, TD, chairman, Trustee Savings Bank North West Central Region.
- Dickie Henderson (Richard Matthew Henderson), Entertainer. For charitable services.
- Werner Wolfgang Heubeck, managing director, Ulsterbus and Citybus
- Anne Dorothea Hiatt Hewer. For services to Ballet and the Arts in Scotland and Bristol.
- Ian Merrick Cuthbertson Hill, Chartered Quantity Surveyor, Newcastle upon Tyne.
- Walter Adam Hill, Member, Hertfordshire County Council.
- Doris Edith Margaret Hoadley, District Superintendent, London (Prince of Wales's) District, St. John Ambulance Brigade.
- Cyril Hobbs, managing director, John Laing R & D
- Thomas Holliday, lately President, Northumberland Area, National Union of Mineworkers.
- Graham Joseph Vivian Horsman, chairman, Forth Valley Health Board.
- John Hosie, executive director and General Manager, British Aerospace (HSA).
- George Russell Howell, Commercial Director, Alvis For services to Export.
- John Hudson, chairman, Northern Gas Consumers' Council.
- Edward James Hughes, Author.
- James Denis Hughes, lately President, Union of Shop, Distributive and Allied Workers.
- Brian Edward Hulse, Treasurer, Oxfordshire Area Health Authority.
- Alan Nathaniel Hunt, chairman, North West Transport Users' Consultative Committee.
- James Napier Hunter, Rector, Larbert High School.
- Frederick Victor Jarvis, Chief Probation Officer, Leicestershire Probation & After-Care Service.
- Thomas John, Traffic Commissioner, Western Traffic Area.
- Denys Jones, lately administrative director, Garringtons Ltd.
- John Gwynedd Jones. For services to local government in Gwynedd.
- Nansi Jones, Principal, Llandaff College of Education.
- Bernard Joy, lately Football Correspondent, Evening Standard.
- Basil Kassanis, FRS, lately Senior Principal Scientific Officer, Rothamsted Experimental Station, Harpenden.
- Lloyd Asquith Winston Ewart Kemp, Senior Principal Scientific Officer, National Physical Laboratory.
- Gerard Kiley, managing director, Conder Buildings Overseas Ltd. For services to Export.
- Irene Beatrice Knight, Chief Professional Adviser, Scottish Council for Health Education.
- Vincent Knowles, Registrar, Victoria University of Manchester.
- William Maurice Foster Knowles. For services to the community in Somerset.
- Betty Knox, District Nursing Officer, Hampshire Area Health Authority.
- Lieutenant-Colonel Harry Lacy (Retd.), MBE, lately Director, British Aerospace (BAC).
- Augusta Lammers, Headmistress, St. Catherine's Roman Catholic Girls Secondary Modern School, Liverpool.
- Sylvia Law, Principal Planner, Greater London Council.
- Herbert William Leader, Director of Publishing, HM Stationery Office.
- Malcolm Campbell Lee, Director of Housing, Nottingham City Council.
- Ronald John Lemon, Deputy Chief Inspector of Immigration, Home Office.
- Robert John Lennox, chairman, Scottish Committee, Agricultural Training Board.
- The Very Reverend Monsignor Sidney George Harwood Lescher, MBE, lately Warden, Roman Catholic Retreat Centre, BAOR.
- Margaret Llewellyn Lewis, Headmistress, Howell's School, Llandaff.
- Thomas Paul Lightbody, Director, Scottish Centre for Education Overseas, Moray House College of Education, Edinburgh.
- Michael Geoffrey Long, Marketing Manager, Space & Air Research Division, Redifon Flight Simulation For services to Export.
- Rosetta Margret Lovett, Senior Lecturer in District Nursing, Newcastle upon Tyne Polytechnic.
- Robert Dodd McConnell. For services to local government in County Down.
- Lieutenant-Colonel David Cormac McCormack, lately President, Road Safety Council for Northern Ireland.
- James Ferguson MacDonald, HM Inspector of Schools (Higher Grade), Scottish Education Department.
- Raymond Ross Macdonald, Secretary, Scotland, Transport & General Workers' Union.
- Josephine McEvoy (Sister Mary Ignatius), Senior Nursing Officer, Mater Infirmorum Hospital, Belfast.
- James Robertson Mackay, Member, Northern Industrial Development Board.
- Robert Kennedy McKnight, Principal Educational Psychologist, Renfrew Division, Strathclyde Regional Council.
- Donald Macmillan, Procurator Fiscal of the Isle of Skye.
- Harry McNab, managing director, John Cossar Ltd.
- John Edward Mahoney, Consultant on Training and Safety, George Wimpey
- Ernest Major, MBE TD. For services to sport and physical recreation.
- Benjamin James Booth Marks, Assistant Chief Fire Officer, Fire Authority for Northern Ireland.
- Robert Beattie Martin. For services to Agriculture in Northern Ireland.
- Leonard Maunder, Professor of Mechanical Engineering and Dean of the Faculty of Applied Science, University of Newcastle upon Tyne.
- Beryl Maxwell, Co-ordinator, Welfare Services Department, Headquarters, Women's Royal Voluntary Service.
- Ellen Wake Mitchell, Member, Northumberland County Council.
- Leonora Muriel Monkhouse, assistant director, International Welfare Department, Headquarters, British Red Cross Society.
- Charles Morgan. For services to the Post Office Engineering Union.
- Clifford Isaac Morgan, President, London Glamorgan Society.
- James Morton Muir, DSO, Chief Medical Officer, Leyland Cars, British Leyland
- The Reverend Stuart Millington Munns, lately Director of Community Industry.
- Philip Alan Myers, QPM, Chief Constable, North Wales Police.
- Tito Jacques Nardecchia, lately Member, Committee on Planning Control over Mineral Working.
- Walter Sidney George Needham. For services to Association Football.
- Henry Samuel Newman, Principal, Ministry of Agriculture, Fisheries & Food.
- Herbert Douglas Nichols, Director of Social Services, Gloucestershire County Council.
- William Leslie Norman, President, National Federation of Sea Anglers.
- Frederick William North, Senior Master, Merrywood Boys School, Bristol.
- Doreen Norton, Nursing Research Liaison Officer, South West Thames Regional Health Authority.
- Mary Genevieve O'Farrell, Principal, St. Louise's Voluntary Secondary Intermediate School, Belfast.
- Robert Paisley, Manager, Liverpool Football Club.
- John Dean Palmer, Member, United Kingdom Seeds Executive. For services to plant breeding.
- George Ernest Papworth, Personnel Officer, National Freight Corporation.
- Sheila Yvonne Parkinson, Corps Commander, Women's Transport Service, First Aid Nursing Yeomanry.
- Leonard Walter Parmenter, lately Clerk to the Justices, Petty Sessional Divisions of Newbury, Hungerford & Lambourn, Wantage, Faringdon & Moreton and Wallingford.
- John Pearce Parry, Principal, Bognor Regis College of Education.
- Peter Phippen, Architect, Partner, Phippen Randall & Parkes.
- John Percival Pickford, MBE DL, Director of Association, Priory for Wales, St. John Ambulance Brigade.
- Henry Porter, Joint Managing Director, Motherwell Bridge Engineering Ltd. For services to Export.
- John William Poulter, Senior Principal, Crown Agents for Oversea Governments & Administrations.
- Ian Durham Rattee, Professor and Head of Department of Colour Chemistry, University of Leeds.
- John Lamb Reed, Singer, D'Oyly Carte Opera Company
- Michael Gaspard Rizzello, Sculptor.
- Vernon Colin Robertson, managing director, Hunting Technical Services Ltd.
- Ian Barnet Rodger, MBE. For services to the Scout Association in Scotland.
- Warwick Owen Ruffle, Principal, The John Cleveland College, Hinckley.
- Adrian Alan Russell, Foreign & Commonwealth Office.
- Captain Douglas McIver Russell, RN (Retd.), DL, chairman, North East Fife District Council.
- John Eric Sargent, Deputy Director-General, Royal Institute of Public Administration.
- Leslie Watson Sayers, Director, Visitors Department, British Council.
- Archibald Dunlop Scott, TD DL, lately chairman, Cairngorm Sports Development Ltd.
- William James Sivewright, lately Engineer, West Dock, Bristol.
- Donn Small, Deputy Surveyor, New Forest, Forestry Commission.
- Frederick Roland Clifford Smith, Director, Woods of Colchester Ltd. For services to Export.
- John Frederick Smith, Principal Professional and Technology Officer, Science Research Council.
- Leonard Edward Reeves-Smith, Chief Executive, National Food & Drink Federation. For services to the food trade.
- Sydney Mervyn Smith, Principal, Department of Education & Science.
- William Lavender Tanner Smith, lately Legal Adviser, National Council, Royal Naval Association.
- Douglas Ronald Snowden, associate director, Hoover, Merthyr Tydfil.
- William Henry Snowdon, HM Inspector of Schools, Department of Education & Science.
- Rachel Faith Elizabeth Haughton Spicer, medical director, London Youth Advisory Centre.
- Edwin Ronald Staniford. For services to the Boys' Brigade in Buckinghamshire.
- Norman Geddes Stewart, Head of Environmental and Medical Sciences, Atomic Energy Research Establishment, Harwell.
- Ralph Donald Summers, Divisional Surgeon, Metropolitan Police.
- Donald Patrick Swann, Principal Youth and Community Officer, City of Bradford Metropolitan Council.
- Sylvia Mary Swinburne, AEA, lately chairman, Women's Cricket Association.
- Andrew Aladar Tessler, managing director, ITI Research. For services to Export.
- Gordon Herd Thomson, Administrative Coordinator, Grangemouth Factory, British Petroleum Chemicals
- Harry Tonge, chairman, Raw Materials Committee, British Textile Employers' Association.
- Ernest Tonkinson, lately Director and Secretary, The Institute of Personnel Management.
- William Harry Townsend, chairman, Cycling Council of Great Britain.
- The Honourable Catherine Mary Trevelyan. For services to the London Celebrations Committee for The Queen's Silver Jubilee.
- John Michael Trewhella, managing director, Exploration & Production Services (North Sea) Ltd.
- Mary Isabella Urquhart, lately Principal, The Elms Technical College, Stoke-on-Trent.
- Joan Valentine. For services to young people in Leeds.
- Ralph Vibert, Senator, States of Jersey, Channel Islands.
- Gillian Mary Millicent, Lady Wagner, chairman, Executive/Finance Committee, Dr. Barnardo's.
- Lewis Arthur Waight, chairman, British Airways Staff Housing Society Ltd.
- Herbert Henry Wall, Editor, South London Press.
- Joshua Samuel Walsh. For services to the community in Leeds.
- Frank Walters, Vice-chairman, Trent Regional Health Authority.
- William John Walters, Director, Engineering Planning, British Gas Corporation.
- Jack Richard Ward, Principal Professional and Technology Officer, Ministry of Defence.
- Philip Gordon Weekes, Director, South Wales Area, and part-time Board member, National Coal Board.
- Daniel West, President, National League of the Blind and Disabled.
- Rex Douglas Whitehead, Technical Adviser, Ministry of Defence.
- Henry Roland Wilcock, Principal, West Oxfordshire Technical College, Witney.
- Edith Hazel Williams, Community Physician, Salisbury Health District.
- Frederick John Williams, lately Area Administrator, Redbridge & Waltham Forest Area Health Authority.
- James Williams, Principal Professional and Technology Officer, Ministry of Defence.
- Richard Oliver MacMahon Williams, MBE MC, Law Agent, Forestry Commission in Scotland.
- David Rowan Wilson, Chief Executive, Wigtown District Council.
- Joseph Ritchie Wilson. For services to the Magistracy in Northern Ireland.
- Joy Leonora Phyllis Woods, MBE, lately chairman, National Savings Street, Village and Social Groups Committee.

Diplomatic and Overseas List

- Leopold Victor Abrines, JP. For public services in Gibraltar.
- Maurice Victor Bane. For services to British commercial interests in the Philippines.
- Patrick Augustine Barrett. For services to British commercial interests in Nigeria.
- Emilio James Barrie. For services to British commercial interests and the British community in Chile.
- Joseph Harold Belizaire. For services to the community in St. Lucia.
- William Collins Bell, deputy director of Public Works, Hong Kong.
- Wilbert Edmund Ingle Blackett, Registrar of Cooperatives, Saint Christopher-Nevis-Anguilla.
- Lionel Henry Blaxell, DSC, Senior Commercial Officer, HM Embassy, Stockholm.
- Douglas Brookfield, lately HM Consul, British Consulate-General, San Francisco.
- Allen Berkeley Bush. For public services in the Cayman Islands.
- Stephen John Carr. For services to Agricultural Development in East Africa.
- The Reverend Eric Witham Casson. For welfare services to seamen in Buenos Aires.
- Aminta Jane Lorraine Castleton. For services to the British community in Montevideo.
- John Cordingley. For services to British commercial interests in Brunei.
- George Edward Chapman, MBE. For services to British commercial interests and the British community in Dubai.
- Andrew James Pascoe Crowden. For medical services to the community in East and West Africa.
- Margaret Fyfe Donaldson. For services to British cultural interests in Argentina.
- Leonard Dunning, executive director, Trade Development Council, Hong Kong.
- Alan Derek Fair. For medical services to the community in Tokyo.
- Charles Stanley Herbert Felton. For services to the British community in Argentina.
- William John Crawley Fishbourne. For services to the British community in Brussels.
- Augustus James Voisey Fletcher, GM, lately First Secretary, HQ British Forces, Hong Kong.
- Philip Irvin Franks. For services to medicine in Brunei.
- Raymond Alfred Fry, ED, Commissioner of Rating and Valuation, Hong Kong.
- Derek John George. For services to the British community in Colombia.
- Peter Henry George Gibbs, Regional Education Adviser, British Council, Madras.
- William Florian Glasford, JP. For public services in St. Kitts-Nevis-Anguilla.
- Albert Francis Joseph Harris, MBE. For services to British ex-Servicemen in Belgium.
- Peter Hedley Harwood. For services to education in Nigeria.
- Austin Bertrand Hawley. For services to the British community in Mexico.
- John Herman Henderson. For services to the British community in Uruguay.
- Richard Fitzherbert Hitchcock, lately British Council Representative, Lebanon.
- Robert Hudson. For services to education in Lebanon.
- Alan Humphries. For services to education in Brussels.
- Betty Margaret Hutchinson, lately First Secretary, British High Commission, Singapore.
- William Charles Wilson James. For services to the British community in New York.
- Captain Arthur James Jarman. For services to British marine interests in Dubai.
- Bernard Kelly, MBE. HM Consul, British Consulate-General, Buenos Aires.
- Norman Kerr. For medical services to the community in the Bahamas.
- Lancelot Alan Keyworth. For services to Anglo-Finnish relations in Helsinki.
- Commander Geoffrey Harold Lewis Kitson, RN (Retd.) For public and community services in Bermuda.
- William Percy Langridge. For veterinary services, in East Africa.
- Hugh Raymond Leach, MBE, First Secretary, HM Embassy, Sana'a.
- Greaham Eric Louisy, MBE, Secretary to the Cabinet, St. Lucia.
- William Sampson Luke. For veterinary services in Kenya.
- George McBain. For services to British commercial interests in Japan.
- James Andrew McKenna. Director, British Council Institute, Naples.
- Gordon Menzies Macwhinnie. For public services in Hong Kong.
- Leonard Palmer Maenuu. Acting Permanent Secretary, Ministry of Foreign Trade, Solomon Islands.
- John Mallon. English Language Officer, British Council, Madrid.
- Sidney James Meadows. For services to Agricultural Development in Kenya.
- Charles Mellor. For services to the British community in Argentina.
- Arthur Joseph Philip Monk, Chief Secretary, Falkland Islands.
- Trevor Ernest John Mound. First Secretary and Head of Chancery, HM Embassy, Beirut.
- Trevor Alastair Moy. For services to British commercial interests in Sri Lanka.
- Nevill Edwin Miller Newman, lately Honorary British Consul, East London, South Africa.
- Donald Robert Niven. For services to fishery development in Bahrain.
- Reinaldo Oblitas, ED, deputy director of Urban Services, Hong Kong.
- Anthony Denis Ockenden, Commissioner of Banking, Hong Kong.
- Peter Richard Merriman Pattisson. For services to medical research in Korea.
- Henry Peter Krohn Pooley, lately assistant director, NATO Information Service, Brussels.
- Donald Rennie. For services to British marine interests and the British community in Yokohama.
- Helen Josephine Rhode. For services to the British community in Genoa.
- Ronald Thomas Richardson. For services to British commercial interests and the British community in Brunei.
- Frank Lindsay Ringland. For services to architecture and development in Nigeria.
- William Hamilton Rodgers. For services to agriculture development in Tanzania.
- Alan Percival Rudwick. For services to education in Ghana.
- Michael Graham Ruddock Sandberg. For public services in Hong Kong.
- Walter Dockray Scott, MBE, Controller of Works Services, Ministry of Works, Lesotho.
- Leslie Wilfrid Slater, QPM CPM, Commandant, Regional Police Training Centre, Barbados.
- Robert Wood Sloane. For services to education and the British community in Beirut.
- Paul Heath Snell. For medical services to the community in the Ivory Coast.
- George Leonard Somerwill, TD, Senior Veterinary Officer, Ministry of Agriculture, Swaziland.
- Bernard Andrew Sorhaindo. For medical services to the community in Dominica.
- Leslie Edgar Sturmey, MBE, lately HM Consul (Commercial) British Consulate-General, Cape Town.
- Michael Jacques Thompson, lately First Secretary, British High Commission, Lusaka.
- Philip Humphrey Peter Thompson, MBE, HM Consul (Information) British Consulate-General, Milan.
- Lyle Boyce Thrower. For public and community services in Hong Kong.
- Harold Guy Wallington, Secretary for Social Services and Communications, British Service, New Hebrides Condominium.
- Mary Wane, Deputy Representative, British Council, France.
- Alan John Waple, MBE, lately Director, Radio & Television Division, British Information Services, New York.
- Captain Ernest Victor Ward, MBE, Marine Manager, Development Authority, Gilbert Islands.
- William Tinto Watson. For services to British commercial interests in Iran.
- John Milton Weedon. For services to British commercial interests in Hong Kong.
- Darvall Keppel Wilkins, MBE, District Agent, British Service, New Hebrides Condominium.
- Bernard Connellan Wilkinson. For services to British commercial interests and the British community in Kuala Lumpur.
- Moulton Vincent Williams, CPM, Permanent Secretary, Ministry of Communications Works & Labour, St. Vincent.
- Siu-Chee Seaward Woo. For public and community services in Hong Kong.
- Jin-hwee Yap. For public and community services in Hong Kong.
- James Oswald Yorston. For services to the British community in Montevideo.

Australian States
State of New South Wales

- Professor Stephen John Angyal, Professor of Organic Chemistry and Dean of the Faculty of Science, University of New South Wales.
- Mark Bishop. For services to education.
- Charles Raymond Blackman. For services to the arts.
- Brigadier Charles Bramwell Cross (Salvation Army). For services to the community.
- Sister Mary Bernice Elphick. For services to medicine.
- Elizabeth Fretwell (Mrs. Betty Drina Simmons). For services to music.
- Bruce James Hinchcliffe. For services to charity.
- Ronald Stanley Lockwood. For services to local government.
- Clive Leslie Lucas. For services to architecture.
- His Honour Frank Roland McGrath. For services to the community.
- Anthony Patrick Millar. For services to sports medicine.
- The Reverend Winston D'Arcy O'Reilly. For services to the community.
- Wallace Keith Pilz. For services to the State and scouting.
- Peter Joshua Sculthorpe, MBE. For services to music.
- William Shaw. For services to music.
- Professor Richard Neville Spann, Professor of Government & Public Administration, Sydney University.
- Keith Leonard Sutherland. For services to science.

State of Victoria

- Dorris Patricia Baer, of Toorak. For services to hospital administration.
- Captain Charles Roderick Curwen, Private Secretary to the Governor of Victoria.
- Joan Elizabeth Grimwade, of Broadford. For services to guiding and the community.
- Reginald Gerard Hoban, of Kilmore. For services to banking and the community.
- Winifred Edith Kennan, of Deepdene. For services to medicine.
- Donald Henry Merry, of East Ivanhoe. For services to the business community.
- Sydney Morrell, of New York, USA. For services to the State of Victoria.
- Alan Bryce Nelson, of St Kilda. For services to architecture.
- Wayne Vivian Reid, of Toorak. For services to tennis administration.
- Val Smorgon, of Toorak. For services to the community.
- George Rathjen Starritt, of North West Mooroopna. For services to the sheep industry.
- Raymond Charles Steele, of Kew. For services to cricket.

State of Queensland

- Councillor Bertie Edward Barden, of Hannaford. For services to local government and the community.
- Teresa Rita O'Rourke Brophy, of Clayfield. For services to medicine.
- Councillor Stanley John Collins, of Einasleigh. For services to local government and the community in North Queensland.
- Enid Alison Dowling, of Tara. For services to women's organisations.
- Councillor William Frederick Garnham, of Carmila. For services to local government.
- Charles Edward Leonard Hughes, of Clayfield. For services to horse-racing.
- George Ernest Purdy, of Clayfield. For services to business and the community.
- Thomas Eric John Roberts, of Aspley. For services to scouting.

State of Western Australia

- William Eric Aspinall, of Claremont. For services to the Homes of Peace and Fairbridge Farm School.
- Eric Arthur Eastman, of Mosman Park. For services to sport.
- Eric Vernon Sewell, of Geraldton. For services to local government.
- Harold John Smith, Mayor of Albany.

==== Member (MBE) ====
Military Division

Royal Navy

- Lieutenant Commander Trevor John Chapple.
- Lieutenant Commander Douglas Ivor Colwell, VRD*, Royal Naval Reserve.
- Lieutenant Commander Thomas Stuart Cooper.
- Fleet Chief Communication Yeoman Paul Wilmot Kitchin, J371333N.
- Fleet Chief Aircraft Artificer (A/E) Alan Julian Lilley, F100893L.
- Lieutenant Commander (SD) Douglas Lynd.
- Lieutenant Commander (SD) Arthur Donald McLauchlan.
- Fleet Chief Steward Alan Norman Marks-Cockett, L923782U.
- Lieutenant Commander (SD) George Pincott.
- Warrant Officer 2 John Edward Porter, Royal Marines, P012114A.
- Lieutenant Commander (SD) Dennis Brian Sharpey.
- Captain (SCC) Frank Charles Smith, Royal Marines Reserve.
- Lieutenant Commander (SD) Wilfred Stanley, Smith, DSM.
- Lieutenant Commander Douglas Richard Taylor.
- Lieutenant (CS) Douglas Alexander Wilkie.
- Fleet Master at Arms Thomas William Wilkinson, BEM, M833677M.
- Lieutenant Commander (SD) Ivor Edgar Williams.

Army

- Major Harry Edward Attenborough (379457), Corps of Royal Engineers.
- 23547580 Warrant Officer Class 1 Michael John Baker, MM, Special Air Service Regiment.
- 23469014 Warrant Officer Class 1 Frederick Lamb Beattie, The Black Watch (Royal Highland Regiment).
- Major (Quartermaster) William Hugh Bentley (480525), 14th/20th King's Hussars.
- 23547372 Warrant Officer Class 1 John Laurence Bond, Corps of Royal Engineers.
- Captain James Brackenridge (472321), Royal Corps of Transport, Territorial and Army Volunteer Reserve.
- Captain Roger Leslie Buffham (490912), Royal Army Ordnance Corps.
- Major James Edward Bevill Conder, MC (235720), The Royal Hampshire Regiment.
- Major Geoffrey Michael Cameron Cottrill (403422), Royal Regiment of Artillery.
- Major (Non Medical) Michael John Dempsey (481021), Royal Army Medical Corps.
- Major John Sherrard Maxwell Edwardes, GM (421239), The Royal Highland Fusiliers (Princess Margaret's Own Glasgow & Ayrshire Regiment) (now Retd).
- Captain (Staff Quartermaster) Donald Henry Elsey (488105), Royal Corps of Transport.
- Major (Quartermaster) Marguerite Joan Evans (479059), Women's Royal Army Corps (now Retd).
- Captain (Electrical Mechanical Assistant Engineer) Robert Arthur Gibbens (486552), Corps of Royal Electrical and Mechanical Engineers.
- 22289007 Warrant Officer Class 2 (Local Warrant Officer Class 1) Louis Gibson, Corps of Royal Electrical & Mechanical Engineers.
- 23673497 Warrant Officer Class 2 Kenneth James Hazard, Corps of Royal Engineers.
- Major David Houlton (450378), The Royal Regiment of Fusiliers.
- 23314143 Warrant Officer Class 1 Frederick Benjamin James Hugo, Corps of Royal Electrical & Mechanical Engineers.
- Captain (Quartermaster) Idris Alwyn James (488939), Welsh Guards.
- Major Anthony Derek Jolley (468914), Corps of Royal Engineers.
- Major (Queen's Gurkha Officer) Kamansing Gurung, MVO (473656), 2nd King Edward VII's Own Gurkha Rifles (The Sirmoor Rifles).
- 22537176 Warrant Officer Class 1 Frederick Ronald Lee, Royal Corps of Signals.
- Major Lewis Trevor Lewis, TD (394830), Royal Army Medical Corps, Territorial and Army Volunteer Reserve.
- Captain (Quartermaster) James Joseph Loftus (487178), Wessex Regiment, Territorial and Army Volunteer Reserve.
- Captain (Quartermaster) Wilfred Lucas (485527), The Gloucestershire Regiment.
- Major (Quartermaster) Frederick Victor Henry Lynch (481973), The Worcestershire & Sherwood Foresters Regiment (29th/45th Foot).
- Major (Quartermaster) Michael James McGarry, BEM (478148), Corps of Royal Engineers.
- Major Anthony Charles Michael Lindsay Miller, TD (428704), Royal Army Medical Corps, Territorial & Army Volunteer Reserve.
- Major David Milligan, TD (442325), The Ulster Defence Regiment (now Retd).
- Major William Chrystall Nicoll (470500), Royal Corps of Signals.
- Major William Gilford Norman (433199), The Green Howards (Alexandra, Princess of Wales's Own Yorkshire Regiment).
- Captain (Quartermaster) Geoffrey Oakley (493638), The Cheshire Regiment.
- Major (Quartermaster) Francis Andre Petra (479420), The Royal Green Jackets.
- Captain (Acting) Rupert Harry Pope (290419), Army Cadet Force, Territorial & Army Volunteer Reserve.
- Major Gordon Michael Reay (613298926), Princess Patricia's Canadian Light Infantry.
- Major (now Acting Lieutenant-Colonel) Nan Rosemary Robertson (466093), Women's Royal Army Corps.
- Major (Staff Quartermaster) William James Scoging (472784), Royal Army Ordnance Corps.
- 23503868 Warrant Officer Class 1 William Shaw, The Royal Highland Fusiliers (Princess Margaret's Own Glasgow & Ayrshire Regiment).
- Major (Garrison Engineer) Geoffrey James Slater (480550), Corps of Royal Engineers.
- Major William Edward Spreadbury (455100), Royal Corps of Transport.
- Major Gerald Christopher Stacey (383323), The Royal Green Jackets.
- 22972519 Warrant Officer Class 1 John Steele, Royal Regiment of Artillery.
- Major (Quartermaster) Peter James Stratton (483100), 13th/18th Royal Hussars (Queen Mary's Own).
- Major Barrie John Fletcher Swift, TD (379884), Corps of Royal Engineers, Territorial & Army Volunteer Reserve.
- Major (Quartermaster) George Gifford Vodden (470508), Royal Regiment of Artillery (now Retd.).
- Major (Quartermaster), now Lieutenant Colonel (Quartermaster), Albert Thomas Ward (471722), Royal Tank Regiment.
- Major (Acting) Victor Douglas Williams (451605), Army Cadet Force, Territorial & Army Volunteer Reserve.
- 22782958 Warrant Officer Class 1 Neville Leonard Peter Wood, The Blues & Royals (Royal Horse Guards & 1st Dragoons).
- Major Roger Vivian Woodiwiss (408084), The Devonshire and Dorset Regiment (now RARO).
- Major (Quartermaster) George Young (474751), Corps of Royal Engineers.

Royal Air Force

- Squadron Leader Keith Edwards (593228).
- Squadron Leader George Alexander Etches, DFC (3511886).
- Squadron Leader George Henry Evans (163346).
- Squadron Leader Peter Fairhurst (579736).
- Squadron Leader Patrick Anthony Field (507767).
- Squadron Leader William Frederick Forrest, AE (173912), RAuxAF.
- Squadron Leader Peter Fry (4181201).
- Squadron Leader Basil John Gowling (4088318).
- Squadron Leader Frank Herbert Gray (572446), (Retd).
- Squadron Leader David Richard Hawkins, (2767499), RAF Regiment.
- Squadron Leader Eric David Johncock (168278).
- Squadron Leader Arthur Kettle (570677).
- Squadron Leader (now Wing Commander) John Bartram Main (609235).
- Squadron Leader Leslie Meadows (1567637), (Retd).
- Squadron Leader Peter Morgan Rickets (198090).
- Squadron Leader Ian Henderson Reardon Robins (4230218).
- Squadron Leader George Edward Sanders (577706).
- Squadron Leader Giles Christopher Shorrock (608289).
- Squadron Leader Donald Warren (592764).
- Squadron Leader Arnold Wilkinson (576155).
- Acting Squadron Leader Cyril Cooper (204352), RAFVR(T).
- Acting Squadron Leader Cyril Edward Paull (1850828), RAFVR(T).
- Flight Lieutenant John Alan Llewellyn (682384).
- Acting Flight Lieutenant Ronald Reginald Page (202637), RAFVR(T).
- Warrant Officer Bernard Alfred Coombes (EO582675).
- Warrant Officer Cyril John Domoney (W4003634).
- Warrant Officer Stephen Flynn (H1308075), RAF Regiment.
- Warrant Officer Gerald Turner Goulding (H1591412).
- Warrant Officer Gordon Higgins (R4017961).
- Warrant Officer Thomas Moon (A4032989).
- Warrant Officer Terence Kinsella-O'Toole (T1291505).
- Warrant Officer Patrick David Smith (Q1891350).
- Warrant Officer Harry Edward George Tizard (D2418031).
- Warrant Officer John Dixon Whittaker, BEM (B3515343).

Civil Division

- John James Abernethy, Divisional Officer Grade II, Cumbria Fire Brigade.
- Leslie Harold Adams, General Secretary, London Central Young Men’s Christian Association.
- William Masson Adams, Chief Superintendent, Grampian Police.
- Robert Dunlop Agar, Chief Inspector, Royal Ulster Constabulary.
- Andrew Allan, Chief Training Officer, Scottish Ambulance Service.
- George Maurice Allan. For services to Wrestling.
- John Anderson, managing director, Ulster Timber Co. Ltd.
- Edward Angus, managing director, Glen Gordon Ltd., Aberdeen. For services to Export.
- Shirley Sefton Brittain Annand, Deputy President, Durham County Branch, British Red Cross Society.
- William George Arkinstall, Organist, Shrewsbury Prison.
- Richard Edmund Aspinwall, Assistant Quality Manager, British Aerospace (B.A.C.).
- David Kenneth Baden, Deputy Financial Controller, Port of London Authority.
- Stanley Robert William Bailey. For services to the paper industry.
- Christopher Latham Baillieu. For services to Rowing.
- Peggy Dorothy Baily. For services to the Scout Association in Wiltshire.
- Janet Queen Ballantine, Physician (Geriatrics), Roadmeetings Hospital, Carluke.
- Valentine Arthur Barnard, lately Hospital Engineer, West Sussex Area Health Authority.
- Ernest Henry Barnes, Lay Vicar, Westminster Abbey.
- Walter William Barrett, Tax Officer (Higher Grade), Board of Inland Revenue.
- Harold Ernest Barriball, Regional Catering Officer, South Western Regional Health Authority.
- Isabel Muriel Barton, Prison Visitor, Stafford Prison.
- Ernest Stanley Bates, Liaison Teacher, Knottingley.
- Euphemia Margaret Bayne, Convenor, Lamb's House, Leith; Vice-chairman, Edinburgh & Leith Old People's Welfare Council.
- Dennis Carter Beal, Senior Public Rights of Way Officer, Humberside County Council.
- William Beggs, Divisional Officer Grade I, Fire Authority for Northern Ireland.
- Charles Robert William Bell, Divisional Officer Grade I, Fire Authority for Northern Ireland.
- Doris Eileen Bell, Executive Officer, Welsh Office.
- Edward George Antony Bell, DSC. For services to the London Celebrations Committee for The Queen's Silver Jubilee.
- Mary Helen Bell, Executive Assistant, Industrial Division, Marketing, Scottish Council Development and Industry, Edinburgh. For services to Export.
- Peter John Bell, Journalist, British Farmer and Stockbreeder.
- Olga Oehone Bellamy. For services to Cheshire Citizens' Advice Bureaux.
- Margaret Belson, Vice-chairman, National Association for the Welfare of Children in Hospital.
- Donald Stanley Bennett, Transport Manager, Broadmoor Hospital, Department of Health & Social Security.
- Helena Bermingham, lately Midwifery Sister, Lewisham Hospital, Lambeth, Southwark, and Lewisham Area Health Authority.
- David Bertram, Local Officer 1, Department of Health & Social Security.
- Peter Alan Cox-Bisham, Higher Executive Officer, Board of Customs & Excise.
- Robert Reid Black, Architect, Partner, Baxter Clark & Paul, Dundee.
- Raymond Bruce Blatchford, Treasurer, Barnstaple & District Sea Cadet Corps.
- Edith Gladys Jean Block, Organiser, London Borough of Southwark, Women's Royal Voluntary Service.
- Berti Ottilia Bobath, Director of Studies, Western Cerebral Palsy Centre, London.
- Julien Louis Boereboom, Senior Executive Officer, Cabinet Office.
- Stewart Powell Bowen, Architect, Senior Partner, Bowen, Dann & Davies, Colwyn Bay.
- Gladys Martha Sismore-Boyfield, Organiser, Stamford Blood Donor Panel.
- Ernest Victor Brad Shaw, Organiser, Leicester and County Citizens' Advice Bureau.
- Margaret Elizabeth Bradshaw, For services to conservation in Durham.
- Harold Brain, Member, Barnsley Metropolitan Borough Council.
- Stanley Guy Brint, Senior Executive Officer, Ministry of Defence.
- John Leonard Brock, Assistant Inspector of Fire Services.
- Clifford Brooke, Director, AMF Clarbro Inc., Leeds.
- Kenneth Brooks, Manager, Experimental and Prototype Department, Dunlop Aviation Division, Coventry.
- Edward James Bullock, Higher Executive Officer, Department of Health & Social Security.
- Charles Henry Burgess, Manager, Pressure Vessel Division, William Neill & Son (St. Helens) Ltd. For services to Export.
- John Henry Burgess, Consultant, Bryce Berger Ltd. For services to Export.
- Janet Reid Burnett. For services to the handicapped in Stirling.
- Robert Reginald Burrows, Foreign & Commonwealth Office.
- Ralph Archibald Bursill, Works Engineer, Electrical & Musical Industries Ltd.
- Joan Marion Button, Chief Superintendent of Typists, Price Commission.
- Rachel Elizabeth Campbell, Headmistress, Mountstuart Primary School, Docks, Cardiff.
- Doris Card, lately Senior Nursing Officer, London Chest Hospital.
- Mabel Cecilia Carey, Senior Executive Officer, Board of Inland Revenue.
- Alexander Bennett Carmichael. For services to Rugby Football in Scotland.
- Anne Carr (Sister Kevin), lately Headmistress, St. John's Roman Catholic Primary School, Gravesend.
- May Lilian Carter. For services to the community in Walkern, Hertfordshire.
- Maurice Arthur Chapman, County Trading Standards Officer, Gloucestershire County Council.
- Margaret Joan Chapple, Regional Collector, Board of Inland Revenue.
- Albert Charnock, Consultant on Diffusion Plant Maintenance, British Nuclear Fuels Ltd.
- Doris Childs, lately Assistant, Overseas Students Services Department, British Council.
- Mary Ann Chisholm, lately Member, Nairn District Savings Committee.
- Derek Albert Thomas Clark, Terminal Manager, Gatwick Airport, British Airports Authority.
- James George Clark, Marketing Executive, Plessey, Mediterranean & Middle East. For services to Export.
- James Henry Clark, Professional and Technology Officer II, Metropolitan Police.
- Jean Mary Creighton Clark. For serviced to the disabled in Hereford and Worcester.
- Jenny Clark, Deputy Head, Myle Cross Middle School, Lincoln.
- Frances May Clayton, AEA, Secretary, Forces Help Society and Lord Roberts' Workshops, Dublin.
- William Bertie Geoffrey Clayton, Senior Executive Officer, Department for National Savings.
- John Norman Clement, Financial Director, Signode Ltd., Fforestfach, Swansea.
- Frederick Walter Clothier, lately Senior Chief Technician, Clinical Research Centre, Medical Research Council.
- Diana Katharine Clowes, chairman, Executive Committee, Royal Soldiers' Daughters' School.
- Christine Mary Cochran, chairman, Northampton Branch, Save the Children Fund.
- Oliver Jestie Cock, Director of Coaching and Development, British Canoe Union.
- Phyllis Susan Colebrooke, Advisory Officer, South East Region, National Association of Citizens' Advice Bureaux.
- Beryl Dorothea Collins, Deputy Headmistress, Burstow County First and Middle School, Smallfield, Horley, Surrey.
- Angela Nadine Grace Cone. For services to the teaching of dancing.
- Elizabeth Mary Cook. For services to the community particularly to handicapped people in Bray.
- Norman Douglas Coombes, Divisional Officer Grade III, London Fire Brigade.
- Nora Winifred Cooney, Secretary, London Borough of Bexley Savings Committee.
- Arnold James Cooper. For services to St. Anne's Hospice.
- Andrew Butchart Copnall, lately Area Sales Manager, Northern Ireland, Imperial Chemical Industries Ltd.
- John Arthur Cotton, lately chairman, Tameside Metropolitan District Education Savings Committee.
- Doris Edith Cowcher, Clerk to the National Council of Voluntary Child Care Organisations.
- Helena Josephine Coyne, Head of Thornton Hall Old People's Home, Sefton, Liverpool.
- William Sedgewick Richard Crabb, chairman, Alan Milne (Plastering) Ltd.
- John Richard Cragg, Chartered Quantity Surveyor.
- Jane Elliott Craig, lately Organiser of Citizens' Advice Bureaux, Belfast Council of Social Welfare.
- William John Crawford, Professional and Technology Officer II, Ministry of Defence.
- Eric John Crosbie, chairman, Wood Green Supplementary Benefit Appeal Tribunal.
- Joseph Wright Cummins, Traffic Clerk, Bristol Omnibus Company Ltd., National Bus Company.
- John Francis Dare, Accountant/Assistant Secretary, South East Territorial Auxiliary & Volunteer Reserve Association.
- Jane Elizabeth Davies, Nursing Officer, Madoc Memorial Hospital, Porthmadog, Gwynedd.
- May Davies, Probation Officer, Mid-Glamorgan Probation & Aftercare Service.
- Lieutenant-Commander Frank Walter Denny, RN,(Retd.), lately Retired Officer Grade II, Ministry of Defence.
- Harry Bramwell Dilley, Principal Trumpet, Royal Opera House, Covent Garden.
- Betty Joan Douglas, Specialist Teleprinter Operator, Northern Ireland Office.
- Mary Leslie Douglas, Matron and owner of Broomhayes Children's Home, Westward Ho!, Devon.
- Christopher Hallam Mylverton-Drake, formerly Correspondent in Beirut, British Broadcasting Corporation.
- George Drake. For services to food warehousing.
- Alexander Duncan. For services to the Milngavie Music Club.
- John Philip Dunn, Deputy Personnel Manager, Headquarters, London, Navy, Army & Air Force Institutes.
- Peter John Earle, lately Export Sales Manager, Medical & Industrial Equipment Ltd. For services to Export.
- Necia Iris Eason, chairman, Scottish Child Care Committee, Save the Children Fund.
- James Frederick Albert Easthope, Professional and Technology Officer I, Ministry of Defence.
- Thomas Easton, TD, chairman, Northumberland War Pensions Committee.
- Henry Stevenson Eaton, lately Secretary, Lambeg Industrial Research Association.
- Marjorie Edge, Organiser, Salford Metropolitan District Women's Royal Voluntary Service.
- Walter Ronald Edge, lately Chief Assistant Engineer, Cheshire County Council.
- John Hugh Edrich. For services to Cricket.
- Hilda Ellison, Personal Secretary, Department of Industry.
- Jacqueline Mary Elstone, Private Secretary, General Electric Company Ltd.
- Matthew England, District Delegate, Amalgamated Society of Boilermakers, Shipwrights, Blacksmiths and Structural Workers.
- Reginald Thomas Everett, BEM, lately Librarian, Institution of Mechanical Engineers.
- Harold Evison, County Secretary, Somerset & South Avon County Branch, National Farmers' Union.
- Ernest Edward Farbrother, Secretary, Warwickshire Savings Committee.
- Philip Edward Lodovico Farina, Scientific Officer, Greater London Council.
- Lieutenant-Colonel Michael John Barnard Farnsworth. For services to the Army Cadet Force in Leicestershire.
- Ruby Eileen Ferguson, Staff Officer, Department of Education, Northern Ireland.
- Edward Frank Filby, Works Director, McMichael Radio Ltd.
- Winifred Margaret Findlay, Headmistress, Delaval Junior School, Newcastle upon Tyne.
- Francis Edward Foden, Head, General Education Department, Loughborough Technical College.
- James Foreman. For services to the Beatrice Webb Trust.
- Henry Knight Forster, chairman and managing director, E. M. Manufacturing Co. Ltd., Pontyclun, Mid Glamorgan.
- Rowel Boyd Friers, Cartoonist, Northern Ireland.
- Doris Irene Fuller, Head of Overseas Supplies Department, St. John Ambulance Brigade.
- Raymond Gardner, Higher Executive Officer, Department of Health & Social Security.
- David Gedalla, lately Secretary, Jews' Temporary Shelter.
- Robert Gemmell, Chief Passenger Manager, York, Eastern Region, British Railways Board.
- Nora Gibson, Secretary, Humberside County Branch, British Red Cross Society.
- Vera Mary Gilbert, Senior Civilian Secretary, West Midlands Police.
- Robert Glen, Higher Executive Officer, Department of Transport.
- Donald Percy Golch, Chief Engineer, Spirax-Sarco Ltd.
- Ernest Gordon Goldfinch, Divisional Clerical Officer, Kent County Council.
- Dorothy Elizabeth Gough. For services to the Overseas Service Pensioners Association.
- Walter Grieve Elder Graham, lately Senior Scientific Officer, Natural Environment Research Council.
- Frances Mary Green, Nursing Officer, Rutson Hospital, North Yorkshire Area Health Authority.
- Thomas Greene, Senior Nursing Officer, Herrison Hospital, Dorset Area Health Authority.
- Wilfred Lawson Gregory, Chief Press Photographer, Central Office of Information.
- John Greig, Captain, Glasgow Rangers Football Club.
- Valerie Eaton-Griffith. For services to the rehabilitation of those disabled following a stroke.
- Arthur Bleddyn Griffiths, Chief Inspector, Ministry of Defence Police.
- William Grifiths. For services to disabled people.
- Alison Margaret MacLeod Grigor, Assistant Secretary, The East of Scotland College of Agriculture, Edinburgh.
- George Daniel Grosch, Higher Executive Officer, Department of Education & Science.
- Doris Grundy, Senior Executive Officer, Department of Employment.
- Edward Charles Gutteridge, Professional and Technology Officer Grade II, Engineering Advisory Services, Crown Agents for Oversea Governments & Administrations.
- Patricia Haikin, Head, Department of General Studies, South Thames College of Further Education, Wandsworth.
- Murlyn Frederick Michael Hakon, Observer Lieutenant, Royal Observer Corps.
- David John Hallard, National Competitions Secretary, St. John Ambulance Brigade.
- Raymond Thomas Hallsworth, Production Manager, Barnoldswick Factory, Rolls-Royce Ltd.
- John Arthur Lewthwaite Halsall, TD, lately Area Secretary/Accountant, Southern Electricity Board.
- Phyllis Eileen Edith Hammel, Headmistress, Accrington Road School, Blackburn.
- Peggy Irene Harnett, Nurse Tutor, West Middlesex Hospital, Hammersmith & Hounslow Area Health Authority.
- John Frederick Harrington, Professional and Technology Officer I, Royal Mint.
- John Harris, Chief Inspector, Lancashire Constabulary.
- Neil Brendan Harrison, Export Manager, Gloverall Ltd. For services to Export.
- Abram Wilson Harrower, Chief Executive, Strathkelvin District Council.
- Edward Herbert Hart, lately Senior Rent Officer, South Tyneside Borough Council.
- Michael John Hart. For services to Rowing.
- Robin John Harvey. For services to Orienteering.
- Thomas Henderson, Curator, Zetland County Museum, Lerwick.
- Kenneth Arthur Hendry. For services to the Magistracy in Cornwall.
- Doris Heubeck, Centre Leader, Kladow, Berlin, Young Men's Christian Association.
- Ivy Hill. For services to Voluntary Service Overseas.
- Nigel Hereward Hill, Sales Manager, Special Projects, John Brown Engineering Gas Turbines Ltd. For services to Export.
- Malcolm John Hitchin, Garage Superintendent (Derby), Trent Motor Traction Co. Ltd., National Bus Co.
- Michael Arthur Hoare, Chief Inspector, Metropolitan Police.
- Alice Aline Anna Louise Hoffmann de Visme, President, The Noah's Ark Trust.
- Ellen Mary Hollands, lately Area Nurse (Child Health & Local Authority Liaison), East Sussex Area Health Authority.
- Francis Henry Holmes, managing director, Holmes & Sons, (Printers) Ltd.
- Roger Holmes, Executive Engineer, Birmingham Head Post Office, Midlands Postal Region, The Post Office.
- Arthur William Holton, Executive Officer, Ministry of Defence.
- Joyce Marjorie Hooper, District Organiser, Hove, Women's Royal Voluntary Service.
- William James Hope, Secretary, Hull Incorporated Chamber of Commerce & Shipping.
- Mary Wood Houston, Member, Dumbarton District Savings Committee.
- Elizabeth Howieson, Social Welfare Officer with the Northern Counties Institute for the Blind.
- John Evan Hughes, Head Office Inspector, London Midland Region, British Railways Board.
- William Randall Hughes, Secretary, Morriston Hospital League of Friends, West Glamorgan.
- Frank Hulme, Member, Branch Committee, Amalgamated Union of Engineering Workers, Blackburn.
- Joan Nathalie Hutchins, lately Health Visitor, Deddington, Oxford Area Health Authority.
- Edward John Ives, lately Deputy Secretary, Southampton University Hospital Group.
- Robert Graham Jack, Professional and Technology Officer Grade I, Department of the Environment.
- Peggy James, County Organiser, Humberside (North), Women's Royal Voluntary Service.
- Thomas Peter Jennings, Joint Managing Director, Phoenix Engineering Co. Ltd. For services to Export.
- Dorothy Priscilla Johnson, lately Senior Nursing Officer, St. Mary's Hospital, Newport, Isle of Wight.
- William Maurice Johnston, Chief Superintendent, Royal Ulster Constabulary.
- David Dudley Lewis Jones, chairman, Dyfed County Savings Committee.
- Idwal George Jones, Science Adviser, Doncaster Local Education Authority.
- John Jones, Inspector of Taxes, Board of Inland Revenue.
- Ilse Joseph. For services to refugees.
- Philip Edward Joyce, Area Manager, General Electric Co. Medical Equipment Ltd.
- Rowland Joynson, Journalist, Accrington Observer & Times Ltd.
- William Howard Hill Kelly, Assistant Firemaster, Strathclyde Fire Brigade.
- Anne Kerr, Catering Manager Grade III, Civil Service Department.
- Frank Thomas Kerr, Deputy General Manager, Operations Control, British Airways European Division.
- John Kilvington Kilham, Group Controller, York Group, United Kingdom Warning and Monitoring Organisation.
- William Alec Kinch, Professional and Technology Officer Grade I, Department of the Environment.
- Irene Constance Amy King, Assistant to the Personnel Manager, South Eastern Gas, British Gas Corporation.
- Archibald Johnstone Kirkwood, Divisional Officer, South and Central Wales, National Union of Railwaymen.
- Frances Lesley Kissack, Head Teacher, Harewood Centre Nursery, Pontefract.
- Neville Labovitch. For services to the London Celebrations Committee for The Queen's Silver Jubilee.
- Morris Campbell Laing, Project Manager, BP Forties Field Project.
- George Cecil Lambourne, chairman, Conservation Committee, Worcestershire Nature Conservation Trust.
- Richard Ralph Lamswood, Senior Officer, Board of Customs & Excise.
- Margaret Edith Land, lately Senior Executive Officer, Department of Employment.
- Graham Arthur Langley, General Manager (Telephone Projects—Marketing), Cable & Wireless Ltd. For services to Export.
- Stanley Langley, lately Senior Executive Officer, Department of Health & Social Security.
- James Law, Director, National Children's Wear Association of Great Britain & Northern Ireland. For services to Export.
- Dennis Charles Leadbeater. For services to Local Government in the Cotswolds area.
- Enid Le Feuvre. For services to the community in Jersey, Channel Islands.
- Marian Ernestine Le Marie, Clerical Officer, HM Procurator General and Treasury Solicitor.
- Ronald George Lemmon, Assistant Clerk (Administration), Charnwood Borough Council.
- Flo Lewers. For services to Paraplegic Sport.
- Edna Louisa Lewington, Higher Executive Officer, Registry of Friendly Societies.
- Thomas Trevor Lewis, chairman, South Wales & Monmouthshire Small Mines Association.
- William John Liggett, Chief Superintendent, Royal Ulster Constabulary.
- Frederic Arthur Lilly, Assistant to managing director, External Services, British Broadcasting Corporation.
- The Reverend Hubert Vivian Little, lately Secretary, National Society of Non-Smokers.
- Frederic Walter Loads. For services to Horticulture.
- Christine Madge Long, Director, Marketing and Publicity, British Footwear Manufacturers' Federation. For services to Export.
- Robert Lovelock, chairman, Southern Region, General & Municipal Workers' Union.
- Hedley John Ludditt, Head of Security Guard, HM Treasury.
- Joseph William Ludgate. For services to Local Government in Basingstoke.
- Iain Ranald Macaskill, Principal Teacher of Classics, Knox Academy, Haddington.
- Esther Isabel McCallum. For services to the Children's Country Holidays Fund.
- Mary Catherine McCormick, Assistant Teacher, Oakleigh Special School, Belfast.
- James Archibald Wilson Macdonald, Accountant, Legal Aid Central Committee, Law Society of Scotland.
- Charles Albert Mack, lately Assistant Secretary for Training, National Association of Boys' Clubs.
- Thomas Ignatius McKeon, Staff Officer, Board of Inland Revenue.
- Samuel Connolly McLaughlin, President, Londonderry District Committee of the Amalgamated Union of Engineering Workers (Engineering Section).
- Barbara MacLennan, Nursing Sister, British Medical Centre, Shape, Soldiers', Sailors' & Airmen's Families Association.
- Douglas McMinn. For services to the community in Chesham, Buckinghamshire.
- George Duncan MacNaughton, Reserve Warden, Muir of Dinnet Nature Reserve.
- Jean Sara Macrae, Head of Algrade Residential Occupational Training Centre, Humbie, East Lothian.
- George Edward Maine, Yard Manager, William Press Production Systems Ltd.
- Leslie Percival Male, lately Sergeant, West Midlands Police.
- Kenneth Victor Manning, lately Headmaster, North Harringay Junior School.
- Thomas Mapplebeck, Production Manager, North Yorkshire Area, National Coal Board.
- Paul Richard Charles Matt. For services to the community.
- Kenneth Joseph Matthews. For services to Race Walking.
- Roy Derek Matthews. For services to Archery.
- Derrick Raymond Melluish, Higher Executive Officer, Ministry of Overseas Development.
- Thomas Wilfred Michell. For services to the community in West Glamorgan.
- Andrew Ritchie Millar, Petroleum Specialist Grade IV, Department of Energy.
- Frederick Roy Miller, Higher Executive Officer, Department of Health & Social Security.
- Donald William Mills, Customer Accounts Manager, West Midlands Region, British Gas Corporation.
- Donald Herbert Milne, Teacher, Market Weighton School, York.
- Ronald Harold Bertram Mitchem, Senior Executive Officer, National Gallery.
- Gordon Ernest Moodey. For services to archaeology and preservation in East Hertfordshire.
- William John Mooney, Chief Superintendent, Royal Ulster Constabulary.
- Fred Moore, Technical Research Assistant, Epidemiology Unit, Medical Research Council.
- Theodora Mary Moorman, Weaver.
- James Lowry Morgan, chairman, Belfast Savings Council.
- Monica Morland. For services to the Lamberhurst and District Choral Society.
- Margaret Evelyn Ruth Morrow, Playgroup Organiser, Northern Ireland, National Society for the Prevention of Cruelty to Children.
- Christine Mary Muir, chairman, Orkney Tourist Organisation.
- John Munro, Inspector of Taxes, Board of Inland Revenue.
- Thomas Foster Munro, Organiser, Buckhaven and Methil Citizen's Advice Bureau.
- Henry Patrick Charles Murphy, Director General, Motor Schools Association of Great Britain.
- Francis Thomas Murray, Chief Inspector, Royal Ulster Constabulary.
- Alfred John Nash, Chief Payroll Officer, Directorate of Finance, London Borough of Lambeth.
- Jane Young Nelson, Member, Argyll and Clyde Health Board.
- Jessie Macleod Nelson, Personal Assistant to National General Secretary, Young Women's Christian Association of Great Britain.
- Joseph Nelson, deputy director of Finance, Aycliffe Development Corporation.
- Sydney Walter Newbery. For services to architectural photography.
- Annie Louise Newman, Senior Nursing Officer, Obstetric Division, St Luke's Hospital, Guildford.
- Vera Ethel Nicholls, Bedfordshire Representative, Regional Committee for Street Savings Group.
- Robert Alexander Nixon, lately Chief Executive, Clydebank District Council.
- Margaret Winniefred Lilian Norman, Factory Manager, Benjamin Russell & Sons Ltd.
- Ida Norris. For services to the community in Newry.
- Ivy North, Personal Assistant to Commissioner-in-Chief, St. John Ambulance Brigade.
- Rhoda Nina Nowell, Court Welfare Officer, Family Division, Royal Courts of Justice.
- Helen Watson Oliver. For services to National Savings in East Lothian.
- George Arthur Outlaw, Skipper, Trawler Dreadnought, Putford Enterprises Ltd.
- Kathryn Rose Elma Owen. For services to the mentally handicapped.
- Monica Eveline Mary Page, Treasurer, Dorchester Squadron, Air Training Corps.
- Dorothy Vernon Middleton Park, Head, Immigrant Teaching Centre, Doncaster.
- Mary Hyde-Parker, lately Welfare Officer, Royal Signals Association.
- William Parkin, Senior Nursing Officer, Church Hill House Hospital, Berkshire Area Health Authority.
- Leslie Gordon Pascall, Higher Executive Officer, Ministry of Defence.
- David Brian Peace, Divisional Leader, Environmental Planning Division, Cambridgeshire County Council.
- Elsie Peacock, Foreign & Commonwealth Office.
- Robert Byron Peters, Chief Executive, Institute of Advanced Motorists.
- Stanley Alfred Petherbridge, Head of Ports and Agencies, the Automobile Association.
- Elisabeth Jeane Piddock, Organiser, Metropolitan District, Dudley, Women's Royal Voluntary Service.
- Joyce Mayfield Piggott, Senior Executive Officer, Department of Health & Social Security.
- Cyril Trevor Plymen, Clerk in Charge, Department of the Serjeant at Arms, House of Commons.
- Samuel John Pomeroy, lately Accountant, Royal Naval Film Corporation.
- Elizabeth Emma Potter, lately Higher Executive Officer, Department of Employment.
- Lieutenant-Commander Cyril Walter Powell, RN (Retd.), Port Naval Auxiliary Officer.
- Christopher Patrick Power, Senior Teacher, Tulse Hill School, London.
- Norman Preston, Editor, Wisden's Cricketers' Almanack.
- Horace Leonard Pritchard. For services to Local Government in Burton-on-Trent.
- Verney Watson Pugh, Farmer, Powys.
- Wilfred Henry Pulleyn, Superintendent Registrar of Births, Deaths & Marriages, Manchester.
- Walter Stanley Quine, Chief Administrative Officer, Lake Vyrnwy Estate, Severn Trent Water Authority.
- Harry Rabinowitz, lately Head of Music Services, London Weekend Television.
- Robert Malcolm Rae, Manager, Almington Gravel Pit.
- Eric Walter Raines, lately Nursing Officer, Fulbourn Hospital.
- William Edward Thomas Read, Deputy Manager, Mechanical Maintenance, Luton & Sundon, SKF (UK) Ltd.
- Robert Leslie Sydney Renaut. For services to the Royal British Legion.
- John Michael Reordan, Personal Secretary, Science Research Council.
- Stella Mary Roberts, Senior Executive Officer, Ministry of Defence.
- Alastair Dunn Robertson, Medical Officer, Polmont Borstal Institution.
- Richard Blakeley Rodger, chairman, Visiting Committee, Edinburgh Young Offenders Institution.
- Edith Emily Rogers, MVO, lately Clerk, Central Chancery of the Orders of Knighthood.
- John Rogers, Sales Director, Eimco (Great Britain) Ltd. For services to Export.
- Arthur Gordon Rose, QPM, Senior Regional Development Officer, Midlands and North Regions, Community Relations Commission.
- Margaret Tatiana Rose, Information Officer, Race Relations Board.
- Derek Harry Rous, Electronics Engineer, Electrical & Musical Industries Ltd.
- Gwendolen Vera Ruddell, Headmistress, Madingley Church of England Primary School, Cambridge.
- Henry Nichols Rutledge, Drawing Office Manager, Swan Hunter Shipbuilders Ltd.
- Maureen Isobel Salter, Superintendent Physiotherapist III, Ministry of Defence.
- Leslie Bertram Sams, Professional and Technology Officer Grade II, Ministry of Defence.
- Raymond Alexander Sanderson. For services to the community in Bromley and Orpington.
- Frederic Idris Saunders, Senior Telex Operator, Commonwealth Development Corporation.
- Oliver Graham Saunders. For public service in Wales.
- Valerie Margaretta Saunders, lately-Vice President, Welfare, Open University Students' Association.
- Frederick Leslie Sawyer, Executive Officer I, Department of Health & Social Services, Northern Ireland.
- Professor Patricia Pearl Scott, Member, Food Additives and Contaminants Committee.
- Margaret Elizabeth Mary Sears, Medical Records Officer, Taunton and Somerset Hospitals.
- Faith Shannon (Mrs. Tofts). For services to bookbinding.
- Thomas Davidson Sheddan, Laboratory and Planning Superintendent, Chemistry Department, University of Edinburgh.
- Elizabeth Amelia Sheldon, Social Work Manager, Health Care Service, Grampian Regional Council.
- Fanny Shemmans. For services to the community in Yardley, Birmingham.
- Arthur Edward Simons, chairman and Joint Managing Director, The Deacon Knitting Co. Ltd. For services to Export.
- Nora Simpson, Senior Executive Officer, Department of Employment.
- Brian Thomas Gartner Small. For services to the Leicester Family Housing Association Ltd.
- Frederick William Smewin, Warden, Conference and Camping Centre, Nash Court, Shropshire, National Association of Boys' Clubs.
- Catherine Anderson Smith, Higher Executive Officer, Department of Employment.
- Charles Frederick Smith, Director, Thomas Fish & Sons Ltd., Nottingham.
- Muriel Winifred Goldwin Smith, Scientific Officer, Ministry of Agriculture, Fisheries & Food.
- Robert Raymond Smith, Clerical Officer, Board of Inland Revenue.
- Thomas Smith, Footballer, Liverpool Football Club.
- Winifred Prichard Smith, Senior Family Caseworker, Northumberland and Tyneside Council of Social Service.
- Joan Hilda Spear, Secretary, Headquarters, Sea Cadet Corps.
- Doris Speed, Actress.
- Leslie Magnus Spence, chairman, Cardiff Rugby Football Club. For services to rugby football in Wales.
- Frank William Spencer. For services to Ballroom Dancing.
- Margaret Annie Spencer (Peggy Spencer). For services to Ballroom Dancing.
- William Francis Stenson, BEM, Inspector of Taxes, Board of Inland Revenue.
- Jessie Stephen. For services to the trade union movement.
- George Ivan Sterritt, Chief Superintendent, Royal Ulster Constabulary.
- Joan Charity Stevens. For services to the study of the culture of Jersey, Channel Islands.
- May Stewart, lately District Nurse/Midwife, Cheshire Area Health Authority.
- Ralph Thomas Still. For services to the London Celebrations Committee for The Queen's Silver Jubilee.
- Howard Routledge Stokoe, Deputy Regional Controller, Ordnance Survey.
- Betty Mary Clark Stone. For services to the community in Whitby, North Yorkshire.
- William Alan Storey, lately System Operation and Development Engineer, North Eastern Region, Central Electricity Generating Board.
- George Cyril Swanson. For services to Local Government in Lincolnshire.
- John William Symons, Superintendent, Smiths Industries Ltd.
- Roger Taylor. For services to Lawn Tennis.
- John Chadwick Tharme, Dock Master, Garston Docks, Liverpool.
- Alice Thoburn, Headteacher, St. Lawrence Hospital School, Chepstow, Gwent.
- Dillwyn Thomas, Inspector of Taxes, Board of Inland Revenue.
- Frances Thomas. For services to the community in Rochdale.
- George William Thomas, Regional Secretary, North Wales, Country Landowners' Association.
- John James Thomas, Area Youth and Community Organiser, Llanrumney, Cardiff.
- Netta Thomas, chairman, Keep Fit Association.
- Alistair Grant Thomson, Superintendent, Metropolitan Police.
- James Thomson, General Manager, Trustee Savings Bank of South of Scotland.
- Leslie John Tomey, lately Higher Executive Officer, Home Office.
- Edith Tomlinson, Clerical Assistant, Department of Health & Social Security.
- Mary King Torrance. For services to the community in Shotts.
- Margaret Torrie, lately Director, Cruse.
- George Edward Turner, Regional Ambulance Officer, Wessex Regional Health Authority.
- Hugh Bryson Urquhart, Director of Housing, Inverclyde District Council.
- Douglas Ian Vickery, Chief Development Engineer (Concorde Environment), British Aerospace (B.A.C.).
- Irene Mary Waddington, District Nursing Sister, Blackburn Health District, Lancashire Area Health Authority.
- George William Walton, chairman, London Branch, Casualties Union.
- Percy Thomas Ward. For services to Local Government in Powys.
- Ernest Jack Frank Watts, Price Controller, Guided Weapons Division, British Aerospace (B.A.C.). For services to Export.
- Brenda Elizabeth Wheeler, Executive Officer, Metropolitan Police Office.
- Leonard Charles White, District Officer, HM Coastguard, Department of Trade.
- Greta Whittaker, County Secretary, St. John Ambulance Brigade, Lancashire.
- Doris Ivy Wickins, Senior Personal Secretary, Law Officers Department.
- Captain Edgar James Wide, Master, P. & A. Campbell Ltd.
- Elizabeth Margaret Wigley, Member, National Gas Consumers' Council.
- Leonard Wilcock, Sector Administrator, St. Helens and Knowsley Area Health Authority.
- Robert Geoffrey Wilford. For services to the Scout Association in Leicestershire.
- Griffith Berwyn Williams. For services to Welsh culture.
- John Peter Rhys Williams. For services to Rugby Football.
- Peter Christopher Bernard Williams, Chief Inspector, Essex Police.
- Dorothy Eileen Wilson, Accounts Secretary, King George's Fund for Sailors.
- Helen Laing Wilson, lately Executive Officer, Scottish Economic Planning Department.
- John Starkey Winterbottom, Agricultural Correspondent, Daily Mail.
- Eric Arthur Wood, Laboratory Superintendent, Engineering School, University of Sussex.
- Frank Wood, Member, Food Standards Committee.
- John Francis Wright, Puppeteer. Director, The Little Angel Theatre.
- Leslie Wright, Executive Officer, Department of Health & Social Security.
- Alice Yates, lately Senior Adoptions Officer, Dorset County Council Social Services.

Diplomatic and Overseas List

- Roger Ernest Allen. For services to British commercial interests in Japan.
- Nancy Hope Marguerite Baretti, Honorary British Vice-Consul, Ajaccio, Corsica.
- Ilse Bartlett, British Council Music Officer, Munich.
- Ellen Mary Barnett, Archivist, HM Embassy, Paris.
- Michael James Baveystock. For services to the development of telecommunications and broadcasting in The Gambia.
- Richard Radford Best, lately First Secretary, HM Embassy, Stockholm.
- Kathleen Frances Bina. For welfare services to the British community in São Paulo.
- Trea Katherine Boake, Head of Documents Section, British Government Offices, New York.
- Mary Josephine Breen. For welfare services to the community in Jerusalem.
- Robert Noble Bryden, Chief Agricultural Officer, Gilbert Islands.
- Hazel Mary Buggs. For educational and welfare services to handicapped children in the Bahamas.
- Barbara Joan Butler, Secretary, Agricultural & Industrial Loans Board, Solomon Islands.
- Jessie Calver, lately Commercial Assistant, British Consulate General, New York.
- Joseph Alfred Canessa, ED, Deputy Commissioner, of Income Tax, Gibraltar.
- Edmund Evelyn Cater. For services to British cultural interests in Chile.
- Ling-fung Chan. For services to the community in Hong Kong.
- Po-fong Chan. For services to the community in Hong Kong.
- Joan Maitland Cooper. For welfare services to the community in Bermuda.
- Ina Marie Craig. For services to the community in Belize.
- Carlyle McNeil Eugene Crockwell, Divisional Officer, Prison Services, Bermuda.
- Major Crook, Vice-Consul (Commercial), British Consulate-General, Düsseldorf.
- Alexander William Cameron Culbert, Second Secretary, HM Embassy, Mexico City.
- Thomas Michael Cusack. For services to the British community in Kyrenia, Cyprus.
- Armando Rafael Diaz, Commercial Officer, British Consulate, Guatemala City.
- Laura Josephine Dunn. For services to the community in Belize.
- Hilda Margaret Fowler. For services to the British community in Buenos Aires.
- Roger Fernand Henry Ghislain Galere. For services to British ex-Servicemen in Belgium.
- Giovanni Everardo Gastaudo. Commercial Officer, British Consulate, Turin.
- Beatrice Irene George. For services to the British community in Tehran.
- Martha Dorothy George. For services to education in St. Helena.
- Louise Mary Gill, lately Administrative Officer, UN Secretariat Geneva.
- Iva Virgilia Good. For services to the community in the Cayman Islands.
- Albert Scott Alvin Grant, Lands Registration Officer, Belize.
- Philip Hames. For services to agricultural development in Sabah, Malaysia.
- Sheila Edith Hammond. For nursing services to the community in Beirut.
- Mary Hartley. For services to education in Ghana.
- Mary Phoebe Caroline Hunnybun. For welfare services to the community in Jerusalem.
- Charles Bartlett Hyde, Postmaster-General, Belize.
- Catherine Mary Judge. For services to education in Caracas.
- Joape Kuinikoro, Chief Engineer, Marine Department, British Service, New Hebrides Condominium.
- David George Lambert, Second Secretary (Aid), HM Embassy, Khartoum.
- John Cummings Lazzari. For services to the community in the Cayman Islands.
- Kin-tak Lee, Superintendent, Preventive Service, Hong Kong.
- Peter Alan Leggatt. For services to the British community in Bangkok.
- Edith Li. For welfare services to the community in Hong Kong.
- Mary Lintern, lately Librarian, British Consulate-General, Durban.
- Patricia Ann Lloyd. For nursing services to the community in the Yemen Arab Republic.
- Israel Obediah Matthew Lowe. For services to ex-Servicemen in Belize.
- Denis Ward McGrath, Commercial Officer, British Deputy High Commission, Madras.
- Leonard Ernest Macey. For services to education in Nicosia.
- Margaret Elizabeth Manning, Pro-Consul, British Consulate-General, Geneva.
- Ruth Evelyn Mansfield. For medical services to the community in Southern India.
- Noreen Ingram Maxwell, lately Director, UN Information Centre, Rabat, Morocco.
- Nelly Paulette Joanine Merrifield, Administration Assistant, Office of the UK Representative to the EEC, Brussels.
- Enfys Oonagh Michaeliones, Assistant Representative, British Council, Finland.
- Major John Denis Monkman. For service to British educational interests in Japan.
- Francisco Xavier Monteiro, Chief Land Executive, Hong Kong.
- Hugh Dudley Morgan, TD. For services to Anglo-Japanese relations in Tokyo.
- The Reverend Lawrence Denis Murphy, SJ. For services to education in Madras.
- Therese Newenham, Personal Assistant, HM Embassy, Quito.
- Edward Newton. For welfare services to the-community in the Ivory Coast.
- Phyllis Gertrude Newton. For nursing services to the community in Natal.
- Robert Julian O'Garro, Commissioner of Police, St. Vincent.
- Frederick Anderson Parris, JP. For public services in St. Kitts-Nevis-Anguilla.
- Kenneth William Penn. For services to education and the British community in Kenya.
- Margaret Peterson, Vice-Consul, British Consulate, Stockholm.
- Joan Mary Pevtchin, Press Officer, Information Department, HM Embassy, Brussels.
- Gwendoline Louise Maude Pichon de Vendeuil, Vice-Consul, British Consulate-General, Paris.
- Kwong-lau-Poon, Accounting Officer Class I, Treasury Department, Hong Kong.
- Lawrence Eldred Pottinger, Protocol Officer, Government of Hong Kong.
- John Hamilton Prosser, Civil Engineer, Public Works, Department, Sabah, Malaysia.
- Ivor Hugh Proverbs, Principal Agricultural Officer, Ministry of Agriculture, Malawi.
- Germaine Anna Marcelle Rippon. For services to the British community in Lyon.
- Mavis Patricia Whitehorn Salt. For services to the community in the New Hebrides Condominium.
- Megan Ethelinda Salt. For nursing services to the community in Malawi.
- Colin David Saunders. For services to Anglo-Ghanaian relations and the British community in Ghana.
- Stanley Clement Scholar, QPM, Commissioner of Police, St. Lucia.
- Albert Edward Shave, QPM CPM, Senior Assistant Commissioner of Police, Hong Kong.
- Victor Cecil Dobson Shaw. For services to the British community in Uruguay.
- Romeo Arden Coleridge Shillingford, Administration Attache, Office of the Commissioner for the Eastern Caribbean, London.
- Mary Joy Shuttleworth, Attache, HM Embassy, Lisbon.
- Edward Henry Simons. For public services in Bermuda.
- John Sisiolo, Senior Tutor, Central School of Nursing, Solomon Islands.
- Walter Keith Henry Smart. For services to the community in Montevideo.
- Ivy Ettie Smith. For services to British ex-Servicemen and the British community in Oslo.
- Miles Metcalfe Smith. For.services to British commercial interests in Sweden.
- Francis Alfred Sole. For services to Development in Malaysia.
- Captain Denis John Sollis, BEM, Master Mariner, Government of the Falkland Islands.
- Frederick John Howard Spry. For services to the British community in Uruguay.
- Arthur Ewart Starling, Chief Hospital Secretary, Health Department, Hong Kong.
- George Steele, Assistant Commissioner of Police, Botswana.
- Margaret Evelyn Steele, Chief Passport Examiner, British High Commission, Ottawa.
- Sze-sui Tan, Senior Assistant Registrar, Registrar General's Department, Hong Kong.
- Taufiq Labib Tarazi, Pro-Consul, British Consulate-General, Jerusalem.
- Tekaai Tekaai, chairman, Co-operative Federation, Gilbert Islands.
- Stanley William Tough, Second Secretary, HM Embassy, Moscow.
- Jean Campbell Walker, Personal Assistant to HM Ambassador, Rome.
- Doris Esme Wall. For services to the community in St. Kitts-Nevis-Anguilla.
- Michael de Warrenne Waller, Senior Land Planning Officer, Ministry of Agriculture, Swaziland.
- Patricia White, lately Personal Assistant, British High Commission, New Delhi.
- Carmen Xerri. For educational and welfare services to children in Gibraltar.
- Harva James Yapp. For services to journalism in Hong Kong.

Australian States
State of New South Wales

- Phyllis Albina Bennett. For services to the arts.
- Dorothy Buckland. For services to the community.
- Forbes Carlile. For services to sport.
- Oswald Cruse. For services to Aborigines.
- Lloyd Edward Angus Flanery. For services to local government and the community.
- Keith Holman. For services to sport.
- Maurice Arthur Kille. For services to the community.
- Ida Elizabeth Lea. For services to the community.
- Arthur George Lunnon. For services to ex-servicemen.
- Helen Sheila McNiven. For services to nursing.
- Alderman Cecil Paul Neilsen. For services to the community.
- Joseph Herbert Orr. For services to the community.
- The Very Reverend Stephanos Pappas. For services to the community.
- Marie Marelle Punton (Matron Punton). For services to nursing.
- Margaret June Ritchie. For services to Legacy.
- Nancy Evelyn Salas. For services to music.
- Shirley Colleen Smith. For services to Aborigines.
- Barry Bede Staunton. For services to life saving.
- Robert Thomas Thompson. For services to ex-servicemen.
- Katrina Zepps. For services to nursing.

State of Victoria

- Peter Francis Bahen, of Flemington. For services to the performing arts.
- Brian Cantlon, of Hampton. For services to the community.
- Lilias Jessie Carmichael, of Lake Boga. For services to the community.
- William John Downie, of Mildura. For services to local government.
- Lillian Georgina Frank, of Toorak. For services to charity.
- Blanch May Godbehear, of East Malvern. For services to the community.
- John James Kennedy, of Camberwell. For services to sport.
- Laurence Herbert Ledger, of Benalla. For services to art.
- Heather Lyon, of Hawthorn. For services to education.
- Councillor Duncan Scott MacGregor, of Baringhup. For services to agriculture and the community.
- The Reverend John George Manning, of North Ringwood. For services to the Baptist Church.
- Sheila Molesworth, of Morrison. For services to the community.
- May Primrose Moon, of Kalorama. For services to the community.
- John Stevenson McCreery, of South Yarra. For services to the community.
- Reginald Neil McPhee, of Ivanhoe. For services to the community.
- Charles Henry Rixon, of McKinnon. For public service.
- Francis James Rogers, of Wendouree. For services to local government.
- Elsie Margaret Stones, of Surrey, England. For services to the arts.
- Elizabeth Summons, of South Yarra. For services to the arts.

State of Queensland

- David Andrew Anderson, of North Rockhampton. For services to ex-servicemen.
- Isobel Mary Annat, of Windsor. For services to nursing.
- Louis Charles Anthony Ariotti, of Charleville. For services to the people of the West, particularly as a medical practitioner.
- Alfred Henry Barry, of Mackay. For his charitable and community work.
- Adolph Albert Benfer, of Redland Bay. For services to the poultry industry and community.
- Mervyn Frank Clark, of Hendra. For services to ex-servicemen.
- Councillor James Norman Duncan, of Kaimkillenbun. For services to local government and the community.
- Douglas George Thomson Gow, of Stanthorpe. For services to the deciduous fruit industry.
- Gladys Emily Hockings, of Labrador. For services to the community.
- Errold Campbell La Frantz, of Gordon Park. For services to cricket.
- Violet Evelyn Lewis, of Lota. For services to the community.
- Joan Marion Ricketts, of Hendra. For services to arts and the community.
- Patricia Agnes Savage, of Kenmore. For services to handicapped children.
- Frederick Edmund Todd, of Bremer Junction. For services to the crippled and disabled.
- Councilor John Harold Young, of Walkerston. For services to local government and the community.

State of Western Australia

- Margaret McLure Ford, of Dalkeith. For services to drama and the cultural life.
- George Reginald Furlong, of Albany. For services to tourism and primary industry.
- James Morrison, of Emu Point. For services to the wool industry.
- James Henry Mutton, of South Perth. For services to the trades union movement.
- John Heywood Reynolds, of Claremont. For his contribution to university life.
- Harold Kevin Riley, of Jolimont. For services to the Surf Livesaving Association of Australia.
- Catherine Mary Thomson, of Albany. For services to the community.

=== Companions of Honour ===
- Sir Arthur John Gielgud. For services to the Theatre.
- The Right Honourable Barbara Frances, Baroness Wootton of Abinger. For public services.

=== Imperial Service Order ===
Home Civil Service

- John Basden Berry, Principal, Board of Inland Revenue.
- Leonard Thomas Blowers, assistant director (Engineer), Ministry of Defence.
- Leonard James Briant, Principal, Police Authority for Northern Ireland.
- Kenneth Robert Brooke, Principal, Ministry of Defence.
- Ernest Victor Albert Brown, Principal, Department of Health & Social Security.
- William Anderson Cross, Senior Principal, Exchequer & Audit Department for Northern Ireland.
- Stephen Morris Davenport, lately Principal, Department of Trade.
- Albert Deane, Principal, HM Procurator General & Treasury Solicitor.
- Peter Emery, Principal, Department of the Environment.
- Alfred Desmond Fell, Principal, Ministry of Defence.
- Neil MacVean Glovjer, Principal, Department of Transport.
- John Robert Gordon, Senior Principal, Scottish Office.
- George Hay, TD, Senior Inspector of Taxes, Board of Inland Revenue.
- Harold Francis Haythorn, lately Principal Professional and Technology Officer, Department of the Environment.
- Donald Charles Horwood, Foreign & Commonwealth Office.
- Susan Hytch (Mrs. Slatter), Director of Sales and Marketing, Civil Service Department.
- Henry Frank Linge, Principal, Department of Health & Social Security.
- Basil Primrose Marlow, Principal Scientific Officer, Ministry of Defence.
- James Francis Mason, Principal, Lord Chancellor's Department.
- Beatrice Moorcroft, lately Deputy Superintending Inspector, HM Factories Inspectorate, Department of Employment.
- John Harvey Moore, OBE, Foreign & Commonwealth Office.
- Sidney John Payne, Assistant Comptroller, National Debt Office.
- Edward Scott, Principal, Ministry of Overseas Development.
- Douglas Senior, Assistant Collector, Board of Customs & Excise.
- Arthur Graham Shallcross, lately Principal Professional and Technology Officer, Department of the Environment.
- Frederick William Stagey, formerly Senior Principal, Department of Prices & Consumer Protection.
- Cyril Arthur Teer, Senior Principal Scientific Officer, Ministry of Defence.
- John Gordon Thom, DCM, Principal, Ministry of Agriculture, Fisheries & Food.
- John Hood Ward, Senior Principal, Department of Health & Social Security.

Diplomatic Service And Overseas List

- Edmund Paul Grace, QPM CPM, Assistant Commissioner of Police, Hong Kong.
- Robert William Primrose MBE, Administrative Secretary, Office of the Unofficial Members of the Executive and Legislative Councils, Hong Kong.
- Derek Carter Readman, Deputy-Director of Immigration, Hong Kong.
- Ralph Nathaniel Robinson, Administrative Officer, Turks & Caicos Islands.
- Ieiera Tira, Secretary, Ministry of Health and Welfare, Gilbert Islands.

Australian States
State of New South Wales

- Albert Montefiore Lake,CVO OBE, The Premier's Department.

State of Queensland

- Patrick-James Killoran, Director, Department of Aboriginal and Islanders Advancement.

State of Western Australia

- Donald Hector Aitken, Commissioner of Main Roads.

=== British Empire Medal ===
Military Division

Royal Navy

- Colour Sergeant David Balderson, Royal Marines, P021375J.
- Radio Electrical Mechanician (A)1 Cecil Stanley Biggs, D052344X.
- Chief Petty Officer David Roy Blanchard, V994615, Royal Naval Reserve.
- Chief Control Electrical Mechanician (SM) Graham Bridge, M903861T.
- Chief Petty Officer Airman (SE) Keith Noel Bridges, D128171R.
- Acting Chief Petty Officer Steward Alan John Bridgewater, D057279L.
- Chief Petty Officer Medical Assistant Keith Cecil Burton, M9131S6Y.
- Colour Sergeant Edward John Davies, Royal Marines Reserve, P990364V.
- Chief Petty Officer (CA) Christopher Roy Dunn, J155940L.
- Communication Yeoman Robert William David Edgar, J962011U.
- Chief Petty Officer (D) Michael George Fellows, J944234N.
- Chief Ordnance Electrical Mechanician John Royston Fletcher, D052403F.
- Chief Petty Officer (SEA) Terrence Folley, J959198H.
- Local Acting Chief Ordnance Electrical Mechanician (SM) Malcolm Frederick Donald Fox, M856844X.
- Petty Officer Stores Accountant (SM) David Glynn, D077149G.
- Chief Radio Supervisor Robert Henry Grass, J889S12K.
- Chief Control Electrical Mechanician (SM) Michael Guy, M967386U.
- Chief Petty Officer (OPS)S Dennis Arthur Hiley, D054481B.
- Leading Seaman (M)QR1 Charles Anthony Keely, J795613Q.
- Chief Petty Officer (SEA) Anthony Edward Philip Kilbourne, J928309X.
- Chief Petty Officer Cook James Ritchie Lyall, M950975P.
- Chief Wren Welfare Worker Maureen Mann, W113822Q.
- Chief Electrician (Air) Peter Alec Moncaster D136668M.
- Musician 1 David Stanley Mullan, Royal Marines, Q003469V.
- Chief Petty Officer Cook Thomas Anthony Michael Ottley, M972132D.
- Chief Air Artificer (A/E) Randolph Rowland Pearce, D055201U.
- Radio Electrical Mechanic 1 John Frederick Pooley, D116436Y.
- Medical Assistant Edward Anthony Pyke, Q027837, Royal Naval Reserve.
- Chief Ordnance Electrician Charles Alfred Rich, X996925, Royal Naval Reserve.
- Chief Petty Officer (SEA) Alfred Robinson, J980056X.
- Chief Petty Officer Coxswain (SM) Shaun Grenville Roscoe, J926331F.
- Chief Petty Officer Physical Trainer Henry Charles Sharp, J581704Q.
- Chief Petty Officer Steward Maurice Linley Turner, L943352K.

Army

- 23784759 Staff Sergeant Michael Altham, Royal Corps of Signals.
- 22566005 Staff Sergeant Thomas John Avery, Royal Corps of Signals, Territorial and Army Volunteer Reserve.
- 23487826 Staff Sergeant James Ernest Bartlett, Corps of Royal Engineers.
- 22772416 Staff Sergeant (Local Warrant Officer Class 2) Albert William Bates, The Worcestershire and Sherwood Foresters (29th/45th Foot).
- 23653696 Staff Sergeant James Carson Bell, Corps of Royal Electrical and Mechanical Engineers.
- 14038880 Staff Sergeant (Local Warrant Officer Class 2) Bertram Leonard Brett, The Duke of Edinburgh's Royal Regiment (Berkshire and Wiltshire).
- 22342565 Staff Sergeant William James Brownlow, Royal Regiment of Artillery.
- 24145066 Corporal (Acting Sergeant) Robert Ellis Boughen, Royal Army Ordnance Corps.
- 24163224 Lance Corporal Barry Robert William Byng, The Royal Green Jackets.
- 23654856 Staff Sergeant (Local Warrant Officer Class 2) William Careless, Royal Regiment of Artillery, Territorial and Army Volunteer Reserve.
- 23540592 Staff Sergeant Olive Coates, Corps of Royal Military Police.
- 24007712 Corporal (Acting Sergeant) Geoffrey Day, Royal Corps of Transport.
- 22224553 Staff Sergeant (Local Warrant Officer Class 2) Reginald Frederick William Drake, Royal Army Medical Corps, Territorial and Army Volunteer Reserve.
- 23163467 Staff Sergeant Alfred Thomas Dunn, Royal Regiment of Artillery.
- 23897953 Sergeant Peter Gill, Royal Army Ordnance Corps.
- 23966733 Sergeant John Alan Gillan, Corps of Royal Engineers.
- 23476401 Staff Sergeant Colin William Green, The Royal Green Jackets.
- 22808955 Staff Sergeant Ronald Gregson, Royal Pioneer Corps.
- 2671376 Staff Sergeant (Local Warrant Officer Class 2) Norman Wilfred Hamblin, Coldstream Guards.
- 23697350 Sergeant Raymond Hancock, Royal Corps of Signals.
- 23545059 Staff Sergeant John Maxwell Hutton, The Royal Highland Fusiliers (Princess Margaret's Own Glasgow and Ayrshire Regiment).
- 6412655 Sergeant (Acting Warrant Officer Class 2) Gordon Hymans, The Queen's Regiment, Territorial and Army Volunteer Reserve.
- 23941126 Corporal Victor Isaacs, Army Catering Corps.
- 21149875 Staff Sergeant Kaluram Gurung, 10th Princess Mary's Own Gurkha Rifles.
- 23546117 Corporal Michael Patrick King, Corps of Royal Electrical and Mechanical Engineers.
- 22800233 Staff Sergeant James Frank Lewis, Royal Tank Regiment.
- 22561756 Staff Sergeant (Local Warrant Officer Class 2) Edward Lillico, MM, Special Air Service Regiment.
- 22276614 Bombardier (Acting Sergeant) Peter Lincoln, Royal Regiment of Artillery.
- 23744899 Sergeant Denis Gordon Lord, Royal Corps of Transport.
- 24037078 Sergeant Malcolm John Luckman, The Royal Anglian Regiment.
- 24112118 Staff Sergeant Barry James Marshall, Corps of Royal Electrical and Mechanical Engineers.
- 23946216 Corporal (Acting Sergeant) James McGookin, The Royal Irish Rangers (27th (Inniskilling) 83rd and 87th).
- 21150452 Sergeant (Acting Staff Sergeant) Mekhbahadur Gurung, 2nd King Edward VII's Own Gurkha Rifles (The Sirmoor Rifles).
- 21159031 Lance Corporal Nandalal Gurung, 6th Queen Elizabeth's Own Gurkha Rifles.
- 23990550 Sergeant Keith Nicholson, Royal Army Ordnance Corps.
- 23732431 Staff Sergeant John O'Donnell, Corps of Royal Military Police.
- 14432783 Staff Sergeant John Raymond Phipps, Royal Corps of Transport.
- 23875022 Corporal of Horse (Acting Staff Corporal) Brian Edward Proctor, The Blues and Royals (Royal Horse Guards and 1st Dragoons).
- 24169264 Sergeant Aubrey Richard Simpson, Royal Army Pay Corps, Territorial and Army Volunteer Reserve.
- 23925858 Staff Sergeant Graham John Stewart, Corps of Royal Engineers.
- 24011721 Bombardier Melvyn John Stockford, Royal Regiment of Artillery.
- 23894008 Staff Sergeant Frank Alwyn Taylor, Royal Army Medical Corps.
- 21125346 Sergeant (Local Staff Sergeant) Brian Charles Thomas, Royal Tank Regiment.
- 23990049 Sergeant (Acting Staff Sergeant) Kenneth Townend, Royal Corps of Transport.
- 23701255 Sergeant Harry Robert George Vowles, Corps of Royal Engineers.
- W/445159 Sergeant Dorothy Elizabeth Walker, Women's Royal Army Corps.
- 22456130 Sergeant Michael John Ward, The Queen's Regiment, Territorial and Army Volunteer Reserve.
- 24009944 Sergeant Roy Watson, Royal Corps of Transport.
- 23523558 Staff Sergeant (Acting Warrant Officer Class 2) Bryan Peter Watts, Welsh Guards.
- W/428630 Sergeant Catherine Whalley, Women's Royal Army Corps.
- 3975199 Staff Sergeant (Local Warrant Officer Class 2) Ernest White, The Royal Regiment of Wales (24th/41st Foot).
- 21002002 Staff Sergeant (Local Warrant Officer Class 2) Fred Whitham, Royal Regiment of Artillery.
- 19149682 Staff Sergeant (Local Warrant Officer Class 2) Harry Whitehead, Corps of Royal Electrical and Mechanical Engineers (now Discharged).
- 23503880 Sergeant Michael Ralph Wintersourne, Corps of Royal Electrical and Mechanical Engineers.
- 24046641 Staff Sergeant John David Woolmore, Intelligence Corps.
- 23697379 Staff Sergeant Barry Woolstencroft, Corps of Royal Electrical and Mechanical Engineers.

Royal Air Force

- Acting Warrant Officer Anthony Forster Charlton, AFM (E4048404).
- Acting Warrant Officer Trevor Charles Hardcastle (B3517121).
- Acting Warrant Officer Stephen John Jones (G0578069).
- Acting Warrant Officer Jack Anthony Roberts (B4012316).
- LO588525 Flight Sergeant Peter James Baughan.
- U1926516 Flight Sergeant Kenneth Bennett.
- C4039285 Flight Sergeant Ronald Albert Chester.
- V40845So Flight Sergeant Terence Charles George Ellender.
- L4131843 Flight Sergeant John Douglas George Hallett.
- F4148050 Flight Sergeant Kenneth Charles Hempstead.
- B0687123 Flight Sergeant (now Master Air Electronics Operator) John Hide.
- NO575844 Flight Sergeant William John Jeffery.
- Y3508343 Flight Sergeant Bernard John Langston.
- Q4166631 Flight Sergeant Michael Arvon Ogden.
- S4107246 Flight Sergeant Derrick Rumsby.
- U4158157 Flight Sergeant Raymond Nigel John Walkling.
- TO682S02 Acting Flight Sergeant Kenneth James Groves.
- B4009553 Acting Flight Sergeant James Bernard Kelly.
- K4093437 Acting Flight Sergeant Terence McCarthy.
- VOS86932 Chief Technician Edward James Ainslie.
- U2597384 Chief Technician Brian Lawrence Hart.
- N4057141 Chief Technician Alan Walter Hodgson.
- P1924949 Chief Technician Michael Neale Whitaker.
- D4256255 Sergeant Richard Malcolm Brown, RAF Regiment.
- Y4267092 Sergeant David Girdwood Cowan.
- C4265837 Sergeant Owen Edward Flint, RAF Regiment.
- C2683788 Sergeant Joseph Murphy.
- AO593620 Sergeant John Thomas Palmer.
- L4148217 Sergeant Michael John Sampson.
- Q4193624 Sergeant Christopher Woodward.
- J1944480 Acting Sergeant Anthony Peter Kirby Palmer.
- U4285430 Corporal Thomas Ferguson Blair.
- J8067441 Corporal John Denis Cookson.
- X4187080 Corporal Terrence John Knight.

Civil Division

- Stanley Adams, General Foreman, CAV Ltd., Acton.
- James William Burns Aitchison, Drilling Superintendent, BP Petroleum Development Ltd.
- Arnold Allen, Senior Engineering Foreman, Pembrokeshire District, South Wales Electricity Board.
- Samuel Herbert Allen, Hall Porter, Altnagelvin Hospital, Londonderry.
- Norman Leslie Andrews, Grounds Superintendent, Winfrith, United Kingdom Atomic Energy Authority.
- Raymond Appleby, Office Keeper Grade 1A, Department of Health and Social Security.
- Alexander Patrick Ashmall, lately Civilian Instructor Grade III, HM Prison Barlinnie.
- Ernest James Aston, Stores Officer Grade C, RAF Hartlebury, Ministry of Defence.
- Archibald Bailey, Civic Superintendent, Corby District Council.
- Charles Robert Ball, District Foreman, Oxfordshire County Council.
- Jack Barber, Labourer/Charge Hand, RAF Alconbury, Ministry of Defence.
- Samuel William Dowling Barkley, Office Keeper II, Department of Finance, Northern Ireland.
- Jessie Kate Battersby, Organiser, Headquarters Supplies Department, Women's Royal Voluntary Service.
- Molly Winifred Bawn. For services to the community in Larne.
- Adam Collier Baxter, lately Sergeant, North Yorkshire Police.
- Freddy Beardsell, Vehicle Examiner II, Yorkshire Traffic Area, Harrogate, Department of Transport.
- Elizabeth Kathleen Eldred Bee, National Savings Group Collector, Aylesbury.
- Nora Elizabeth Bell, lately Cleaner, Forensic Science Laboratory, Harrogate, Home Office.
- Wilfred Leonard Bennett, Gas Meter Examiner III, Department of Energy.
- John Samuel Besley, Deputy Chief Warder, British Museum.
- Percy William Best, Professional and Technology Officer Grade IV, HMS Daedalus, Gosport, Ministry of Defence.
- Violet Rose Bickers, Senior Messenger, Department of Education and Science.
- Arthur James Biffin, Motor Transport Driver (Chargehand), Royal Naval College, Greenwich, Ministry of Defence.
- John Charles Bird, Fitter Crane Packer, Jones Cranes Ltd. For service to Export.
- William Arthur Bluck, lately Clerk of Works, Warwickshire County Council.
- John Henry Bolt, Joiner, Sunderland Shipbuilders.
- John Ewart Bowen, Head of Bindery, National Library of Wales.
- George Edwin Braddock, Lace-maker's (Twisthands) Assistant, Guy Birkin Ltd., Nottingham. For services to Export.
- William Henry Brassington, Overseas Installation Engineer, Farrow Irrigation Ltd. For services to Export.
- Leslie Broad, District Inspector, United Kingdom, Commonwealth War Graves Commission.
- David Brown, Chargehand Electrician, Ravenscraig Steelworks, Scottish Division, British Steel Corporation.
- Robert Charles Brown. For services to the fishing industry in Dorset.
- Hestor Bryant, Cleaner, Department of Employment.
- Joseph Buchan, Machine Setter, Transmission Division, Borg Warner Ltd.
- William Henry Burgoyne, Divisional Commandant, Devon and Cornwall Special Constabulary.
- James Reginald Cadle, Fitter, M. L. Aviation Co. Ltd.
- John Cairns, Supervisor, Natural Gas Information Centre, Scottish Region, British Gas Corporation.
- Kenneth Wilce Campbell, Sergeant, West Mercia Constabulary.
- Caroline Mary Cangley, Clothing Organiser, Bootle, Women's Royal Voluntary Service.
- Ormond Hazel Carter, Arboriculture Manager, W. C. Amey & Co.
- Blayney William Cartwright, Chief Observer, No. 31 (Belfast) Group, Royal Observer Corps.
- Harold Cawtherley, Sub Officer, Lancashire Fire Brigade.
- Albert Charles Edward Chalmers, lately Constable, Metropolitan Police.
- Joseph Clark, Stoneman, Murton Colliery, North East Area, National Coal Board.
- Kathleen Mary Clark. For services to the Save the Children Fund.
- Percival George Clarke, Chief Naval Auxiliaryman, Liverpool, Royal Naval Auxiliary Service.
- Alexander Coghill, lately National Savings Collector, Castletown, Caithness.
- Louis Collins, Senior Shift Operator, Dalmuir Sewage Treatment Works, Drainage Department, Glasgow Corporation.
- William Bray Collins, Wagon Inspector, Workington Works, Teesside Division, British Steel Corporation.
- Doris May Conway, Coil Winder Setter, I.C.L., Letchworth.
- John William Cook, Head Herdsman, C. L. Bembridge Ltd., Lincoln.
- James Corrigan, Coastguard, Officer 1, Officer in Charge, HM Coastguard, Eyemouth, Department of Trade.
- Leonard George Cosford, Test Fitter, Metropolitan Police Office.
- William John Coulter, Constable, Belfast Harbour Police.
- James Thomas Cousin, Sheet Metal Worker, Airscrew Howden Ltd.
- Jack Reginald Cracknell, Sheet Metal Worker, R.E.M.E., Aldershot, Ministry of Defence.
- Gladys May Bettney Craddock, National Savings Group Collector, Wirral.
- Connor John Creaney, Group Collector, Ulster Savings Movement.
- George Albert Crook, Sergeant, Metropolitan Police.
- John Cross, Supervisory Clerk of Works, Lancashire Sub-Unit, North Western Road Construction Unit.
- Stanley James Crow, Senior Messenger, Northern Ireland Office.
- Edward George Cuckston, Map Mounter, Board of Inland Revenue.
- Isabella Margaret Cuthbert, Nursery Nurse, Friarton Nursery School, Perth.
- John William Darke, Senior Paper Keeper, Patent Office.
- Kenneth Noah Davies, Sub-Officer, Gwent Fire Brigade.
- Charles James Davis, Senior Foreman, Albro Fillers and Engineering Co. Ltd.
- Lucy Gwendolen Dawson, Foster Mother, London Borough of Wandsworth.
- Albert Sidney Denton, Groom, Royal Military Academy, Sandhurst.
- Charles Devine, Motor Driver, National Carriers Ltd., National Freight Corporation.
- John Samuel Dodds, Supervisor, Maintenance, Building Maintenance Section, British Broadcasting Corporation.
- John Donaldson, Industrial Worker, Department of Manpower Services, Northern Ireland.
- John Albert Donaldson, Special Duties Officer, Department of Architecture, Edinburgh District Council.
- George Young Dougall. For services to handicapped children in Edinburgh.
- Peter Dove, Yard Superintendent, Reading, Thames Water Authority.
- Sidney Dowse, lately Mayor's Officer and Town Crier, Devizes Town Council.
- James Henry Drennan, Sub-Officer, Fire Authority for Northern Ireland.
- Mair Eluned Dunn, Linen Room Supervisor, Putney Hospital, London.
- Arthur Maitland Dunning, Process and General Supervisory Grade "C", Ministry of Defence.
- Denis Edwards, General Foreman and Depot Superintendent, North Warwickshire Borough Council.
- Ernest Edwards, Bellringer, Wrexham Parish Church.
- Winifred Ruth Elders, National Savings Group Collector, Scarborough.
- Edward Charles Elmer, Staff Sergeant, Ambulance Division, London District, St. John Ambulance Brigade.
- Tom England, Supervisor, West Yorkshire County Council.
- Gwilym Benjamin Evans, Calf Certifying Officer, Ministry of Agriculture, Fisheries and Food.
- Olive Mary Evans, Cook/Housekeeper, South Glamorgan.
- Doris May Eveleigh, School Crossing Patrol, Westminster.
- Frederick George Everett, Office Keeper 1A, Property Services Agency, Department of the Environment.
- Kathleen Eves, Local Organiser, Workington, Cumbria, Women's Royal Voluntary Service.
- Andrew Baird Ferguson, Sub-Officer, Cove Fire Station, Strathclyde Fire Brigade.
- Louis Flagg, Yard Supervisor (Fratton), Southern Region, British Railways Board.
- Rqger Richard Flynn, Estate Warden, Property Services Agency, Department of the Environment.
- William Martin Ford, Foreign & Commonwealth Office.
- Leo Denis Joseph Fretwell, Electrician, Shirebrook Colliery, North Derbyshire Area, National Coal Board.
- Maurice James Galvin, Constable, Merseyside Police.
- Edward Gammidge, 1st Floor Man/Cogger, Sheffield 3 Mills, Sheffield Division, British Steel Corporation.
- Terence Sydney Garnsworthy, Centre Cadet Officer, Devon Branch, British Red Cross Society.
- Malcolm Raymond Gaunt, Colour Sergeant, Walsall Sea Cadet Unit, Marine Cadet Detachment, Sea Cadet Corps.
- Grace Bella Maud Gilbert, Cook/Supervisor, Reydon Modern School, Suffolk.
- Henry George Gilbert, Butler, Government House, Jersey.
- Derek Richard Gillott, Underground Development Chargeman, Thoresby Colliery, North Notts. Area, National Coal Board.
- George Albert Glover, Inspector, Bar and Rod Mill, Quality Control, Stockbridge Works, Sheffield, British Steel Corporation.
- Cassie Sabina Mary Goldspink, Cleaning Supervisor, Department of Trade.
- Alfred Goss, Distribution Maintenance Technician, East Midlands Region, British Gas Corporation.
- Lilian Doreen Gough, Catering Supervisor, Crumpsall Open Air Special School, Manchester.
- Arthur Grant, Electric Welder, Armament Division, Engineering Group, Vickers Ltd.
- George Henry Grass, Foreman, Bradgate Park and The Beacon, Leicestershire County Council.
- William Henry Sloan Gray, Dredging Superintendent, Port of Sunderland Authority.
- Frederick Stephen Greef, lately Head Gardener, Oxburgh Hall, Norfolk, The National Trust.
- Harry Griffiths, Services Foreman, Bold Power Station, North Western Region, Central Electricity Generating Board.
- Peter James Griggs, Sergeant, Tayside Police.
- William Grove, Engine Room Storekeeper, Houlder Brothers and Co.
- Charles Robert Hall, Sergeant, Royal Ulster Constabulary.
- Alexander Halliday. For services to the community, particularly to Law Hospital, Lanarkshire.
- Marion Sommerville Hamilton, Blood Donor Attendant, Blood Transfusion Service, Hamilton.
- Kenneth Hams, Process Engineer, Neutron Division, Marconi-Elliott Avionic Systems Ltd.
- Joseph Edward Handy, Foreman (General Services), Stella South Power Station, North Eastern Region, Central Electricity Generating Board.
- Cyril Ambrose Joseph Harbinson, Driver, Property Services Agency, Department of the Environment.
- Herbert Silvester Hargreaves, Groundsman, Victory Ground, Bury St Edmunds.
- Alfred Harper, Butler, Hillsborough Castle, Northern Ireland.
- Stanley Cecil Harrold, Assistant Superintendent, Bristol Avon Division, Wessex Water Authority.
- Doris Heitman, lately Superintendent of Cleaners, Cabinet Office.
- Elsie Marion Hensman. For services to the Rushden Hospital, Rushden, Northants.
- Charlton Clarke Herdman, Constable, Royal Ulster Constabulary.
- Ronald Herbert Higgins, Deputy Farm Manager, Institute for Research on Animal Diseases.
- John Henry Sidney Hiley, Gardener I, Defence Operational Analysis Establishment, West Byfleet, Ministry of Defence.
- Dennis William Hill, Warrant Officer, No. 303 Squadron, Air Training Corps.
- Joseph Henderson Hodge, Explosives Officer, Killoch Colliery, Scottish Area, National Coal Board.
- Stanley George Hooks, Fireman, London Fire Brigade.
- Cyril Houldsworth, Calf Certifying Officer, Ministry of Agriculture, Fisheries and Food.
- Raymond Denis Husband. For services to the Physically Handicapped in Southampton.
- James Irvine, Senior Tool Designer, British Aerospace (B.A.C.)., Preston.
- Thomas William Jelley, Grinder and Polisher, Herbert & Sons Ltd., Haverhill, Suffolk.
- Ellenor Jobling, Tracer, Naval Drawing Office, Swan Hunter Shipbuilders Ltd.
- Eric Johnson, Farm Manager, HM Prison Ashwell.
- Vivienne Gladys Johnson, Member, City of Westminster, Women's Royal Voluntary Service.
- Caradog Jones. For services to the community of Mynytho, Gwynedd.
- David Williams Jones, Forestry Officer, Telford Development Corporation.
- Henry William Kemp, Supervisor Class "B", Shipping and International Services Division, British Railways Board.
- Norman Kidd, Senior Electrician, Robert B. Massey and Co. Ltd. For services to Export.
- Jean Stevenson Kirby, Shop Floor Supervisor, Marconi Space and Defence Systems.
- Roy Michael Knight, Foreman Fitter, Property Services Agency, Department of the Environment.
- William George Lakin, Messenger, Crown Court, Inner London Sessions House.
- Emma Rosetta Lamb, School Crossing Patrol, Hainault, Essex.
- Edward Charles Langley, Time Official, Dover Mill, Wiggins Teape Ltd.
- Francis Thomas Lavin, Messenger, Department of Education, Northern Ireland.
- Percy William Lester, Process and. General Supervisory Grade D, Ministry of Defence.
- Gordon Lightfoot, Non-Technical Class Grade C, Northern Division, Springfields Nuclear Power Development Laboratories.
- Karl Nathaniel James Lindenberg, Foreman, Rigging Shop, Bridon Fibres and Plastics.
- Henry Wilson Lowry, Driver, Ulsterbus Ltd.
- Richard Thomas Luckhurst, Distribution Foreman (General) Grade 1, South Eastern Electricity Board.
- Hugh McClune, Driver, Citybus Ltd.
- Joseph McHugh, Pipefitter, Organics Division, Imperial Chemical Industries Ltd.
- Peter McInally, Foreman Dairyman, Hannah, Research Institute.
- John Cochrane McLeish, lately Professional and Technology Officer III, Royal Ordnance Factory, Bishopton, Ministry of Defence.
- Jane Suttie McLeod, School and Dining Attendant, Eassie Primary School, Angus.
- Robert Leslie Maguire, Committee Member, Enfield Unit, Sea Cadet Corps.
- Annie Maud Martin. For services to the community in Wilton Gilbert, Durham.
- Ronald Mayall, Sub Officer, West Midlands Fire Brigade.
- Peter John Meakin, Commandant, Merseyside Special Constabulary.
- Lillian Millington, Welfare Assistant, Highfurlong School, Blackpool.
- George Ernest Victor Mitchell, Messenger, Board of Inland Revenue.
- Samuel Mitchell, Constable, Royal Ulster Constabulary.
- William Lionel Moggridge, Section Leader Evaluation Engineer, British Aerospace (B.A.C.) Ltd.
- James Speer Foster Moody, Sergeant, Ministry of Defence Police, RAF Sydenham.
- Roland John Moody, Meter Shop Foreman, Hampshire River and Water Division, Southern Water Authority.
- George Frederick Mortimer, DSM, Process and General Supervisory Grade E, HMS Drake, Devonport.
- John Edwin Mumby, Relief Signalman (Immingham), Eastern Region, British Railways Board.
- George Edward Munday, Supervisor, Household Staff, Engineering Training Department, British Broadcasting Corporation.
- Lance Munday, Constable, Metropolitan Police.
- Michael John Murray, Sub-Officer, Fire Authority for Northern Ireland.
- George Albert Nixon, Sergeant, Royal Ulster Constabulary.
- Edward Nolan, Printing Officer, HM Stationery Office.
- John O'Hagan, Driver, Black Hill Transmitting Station, Independent Broadcasting Authority.
- John Joseph O'Shea, Senior Messenger, Ministry of Defence.
- John William Kenneth Ottway, Paperkeeper, Board of Customs and Excise.
- Barrie John Parsons, Chief Photoprinter, Ministry of Overseas Development.
- Joan Peachey, Local Organiser, Buckingham, Women's Royal Voluntary Service.
- Raymond Gould Pearce, Senior Operating Department Assistant, General Hospital, Great Yarmouth.
- Ethel Mary Penfound, lately Centre Organiser, Avon Branch, British Red Cross Society.
- Raymond Charles Pennock, Member, Weybridge Division, St. John Ambulance Brigade.
- Joan Mabel Phillipps, Member, Bideford, Women's Royal Voluntary Service.
- John Edward Gerrard Pierpoint, Surveyor Grade III, Ordnance Survey.
- Rosina Annie Pilcher, Cleaner, Civil Service Department.
- William Burrough Postlethwaite, Process and General Supervisory Grade "C", Proof and Experimental Establishment, Eskmeals, Ministry of Defence.
- Grahame George Langley Powers, Bus Conductor, Thamesdown Passenger Transport Undertaking.
- Sadie Jane Primrose, Warehouse Girl, J. & P. Coats (UK) Ltd., Anchor Mills, Paisley.
- Leonard John Pringle, Digger Driver, Minerals Department, Tubes Division, British Steel Corporation.
- Norman Alan Rant, First Storekeeper, SS Oriana, P. & O. Group.
- Joseph Thomas George Ratley, Special Project Engineer, Rolls-Royce (1971) Ltd., Bristol Engine Group, Bristol.
- Digby Roe Rees, Charge Hand Electrician, Ordnance Factory, Glascoed, Ministry of Defence.
- Lyndell Margaret Rees, National Savings Group Collector, Port Talbot.
- Margaret Rendall. For services to the community in Edinburgh.
- Donald Fraser Renton, Grade 1 Foreman, Cockenzie Power Station, South of Scotland Electricity Board.
- John Nicolson Ross, lately Sergeant, British Transport Police.
- Stanley Meredith Ruck, Foreign & Commonwealth Office.
- Robert Christopher Rushmer. For services to the fishing industry in Norfolk.
- Thomas Russell, Subpostmaster, Pembridge, Hereford, Wales and the Marches Postal Board, The Post Office.
- Elsie Muriel Sale, Old People's Welfare Organiser, Warwickshire, Women's Royal Voluntary Service.
- Cyril Webber Salway, Building Supervisor, Taunton Deane Borough Council.
- David George Scott, Chauffeur, Great London Council.
- Dora Florence Scott, Cleaner, Board of Customs and Excise.
- Frederick Charles Selby, Gas Fitter, South Eastern Region, British Gas Corporation.
- Elsie Alice Elizabeth Seward. For services to St. Bartholomew's Hospital, Rochester, Kent.
- John Sewell, Caretaker, Territorial Auxiliary Volunteer Reserve Centre, Shirley, West Midlands.
- Bernard Sheridan, Telex Operator, Eggar Forrester (Holdings) Ltd., London E.1.
- Ernest Shortland, Night Superintendent, Bar Department, British Rolling Mills Ltd.
- Thomas George Simpkins, Warehouse Controller, Philip & Tacey Ltd., Andover, Hampshire.
- Gordon Skene, Shipkeeper, HMS Cambria, Ministry of Defence.
- Gertrude Mona Skillicorn, Cook, Victoria Memorial Hospital, Runcorn, Cheshire.
- Raymond Charles Slocombe, Sergeant, Metropolitan Police.
- Alfred Stanley Smith, lately Foreman Carpenter, Ipswich Port Authority.
- Ernest Smith, Bridge-Keeper, River Welland, Lincolnshire County Council.
- Hilda Amelia Mary Smith, Manager 1, Navy, Army and Air Force Institutes, The Depot, Royal Marines.
- Leonard Smith, Leader, The Warrington Boys' Club.
- Emily Ellen Smith, Military Plume Maker, Appleton's of Hammersmith.
- Stanley George Smith, lately Operation and Maintenance Foreman, Cambridge District, Eastern Electricity Board.
- Lewis George Percival Southwell, Store Officer Grade D, HM Victualling Depot, Botley, Ministry of Defence.
- William Edward Sparrow, Non-Technical Class Grade C, Atomic Energy Research Establishment, Harwell.
- William Thomas Spittle, Night Shift Foreman, Machine Shop, British Aerospace (B.A.C.).
- Onslow John Springhall, Foreign & Commonwealth Office.
- James Westgate Stanley, Piano-miller Operator, Baker Perkins Ltd. For services to Export.
- James Dixon Stevens, Postman, Cardiff Head Post Office, Wales and the Marches Postal Board, The Post Office.
- Michael Paul Stevenson, Sergeant, Northamptonshire Police.
- Francis Norman Stott, Supervisor, Technical College Liaison, Rolls-Royce (1971) Ltd.
- Frederick Stowe, lately Foreman, Butts Stadium, Coventry City Council.
- Cyril Frederick Street, Progression, Ministry of Defence.
- Emily Eleanor Street, Duplicator Operator, Office of Fair Trading.
- Alice Maud Styles, National Savings Group Collector, Sheffield.
- George Vernon Swanwick, Underground Fitter, Babbington Colliery, South Notts. Area, National Coal Board.
- Mary Robertson Taylor, Blood Donor Organiser, Blood Transfusion Service, South-East Scotland.
- William Ronald Taylor, lately Tool and Cutter Grinder, B. O. Morris Ltd.
- Brinley Thomas, Driver, Winter Hill Transmitting Station, Independent Broadcasting Authority.
- Alexander Fraser Todd, Messenger, Sheriff Court, Stirling.
- William Moore Tomlinson, Professional and Technology Officer Grade III, Glasshouse Crops Research Institute.
- Agnes Gilmour Foley Tracey, Senior Fire Control Operator, Fife Fire Brigade.
- Joan Sybil Winifred Trussell, National Savings Group Collector, Goffs Oak, Hertfordshire.
- Thomas Lane Tucker, Constable, Metropolitan Police.
- James Turpin, Coxswain, Fowey Life-boat, Royal National Lifeboat Institution.
- Mary Vick, District Organiser, Welwyn/ Hatfield, Women's Royal Voluntary Service.
- Harold Bertram Vidler, Process and General Supervisory Grade "D", Royal Armament Research and Development Establishment, Ministry of Defence.
- Alexander Vinters, Pressing Room Manager, Robert Hirst and Co. Ltd.
- Robert Gerald Walker, Chief Officer Class II, Northern Ireland Prison Service.
- Albert Arthur Walkington, Constable, West Yorkshire Metropolitan Police.
- Luke Walsh, Technical Officer, Service Division, North West Telecommunications Region, The Post Office.
- Dennis Roy Warner, Senior General Foreman, George Wimpey & Co. Ltd. For services to Export.
- Harry Warren, Sub Officer, North Yorkshire Fire Brigade.
- Charles Waterhouse, Coal Merchant, Howden, Nr. Goole, Yorkshire.
- Emily Alice Annie Webb, Forewoman Cleaner, Metropolitan Police Office.
- Howard Albert Wenban, Civilian Instructional Officer, HM Prison Wandsworth.
- William James Walter West, Gas Fitter, Southern Region, British Gas Corporation.
- Arthur Henry Wheeler, Piermaster (Marine Services Officer III), Portsmouth, Ministry of Defence.
- Queenie Marjorie White, National Savings Group Collector, Chard.
- Louis James Wilde, Senior Assistant, Investigation Division, Central Headquarters, The Post Office.
- William Henry Wright, Shift Operator, Natural Gas Terminal, Bacton, Norfolk, British Gas Corporation.
- Beatrice Young. For services to the community, particularly to youth, in Yeovil, Somerset.
- Overseas Territories Norman Nelson Gumming, Draughtsman, Tourist Department, Gibraltar.
- Albert Franklyn Glass, Sergeant of Police and Island Council Leader, Tristan da Cunha.
- Taurabakai Iuta, Foreman of Works, Ministry of Local Government, Gilbert Islands.
- Lai Ming, lately Clerical Officer, Class I, Police Department, Hong Kong.
- Doris Elvina Lloyd. For welfare services to children in St. Kitts-Nevis-Anguilla.
- Mak Tai-sang, lately Land Inspector I, Hong Kong.
- Lloyd Wilbert Munnings, Steward, Government House, Belize.
- Joseph Olu. For public and community services in the Solomon Islands.
- Leroy Josiah Penn, Fisheries Officer, Turks and Caicos Islands.
- Rosalind Agatha Penn. For services to the community in the British Virgin Islands.
- Rose Dominge Vanterpool. For services to education and the community in the British Virgin Islands.
- Matias Victory, Bailiff, Supreme Court, Gibraltar.

Australian States
State of New South Wales

- Ian William Armstrong. For services to local government and the community.
- Percy Veldon Bridge. For services to ex-servicemen.
- Morris Joseph Bulpit. For services to ex-servicemen.
- Rachel Caroline Jane Burgess. For services to the community.
- June Bonnie Davies. For services to the community.
- Nancye Florence Georgas. For services to the State.
- Sidney James Grant. For services to sport.
- Ethel May Haylings. For services to ex-servicemen.
- Betty Hughes. For services to nursing.
- Mary Edith Johnson. For services to the community.
- Ann Elizabeth Penfold. For services to the community.
- Violet May Pflugradt. For services to the community.
- Eileen Margaret Potter. For services to the community.
- Kenneth George Stevenson. For services to the community.
- Muriel Florence Westerweller. For services to the community.

State of Victoria

- Joseph Alan Assender, of Deepdene. For services to scouting.
- Cyril Thomas Barling, of Reservoir. For services to the community.
- Alfred Osborne Bird, of Pascoe Vale South. For services to education.
- Walter Gordon Birks, of Moe. For services to medicine and the community.
- Ida Isles Bond, of Thornbury. For services to the community.
- Allen Brownbill, of Laanecoorie. For services to the local government.
- Allan Macleay Gumming, of Highton. For services to the community.
- Roy Alfred Driver, of Camberwell. For services to the community.
- Edna Margaret Glassborow, of South Caulfield. For services to the community, particularly the mentally handicapped.
- Veronica Mary Griffiths, of Yarram. For services to the community.
- Russell Harold Hale, of Camberwell. For services to the community.
- William Nicholas Haw, of Boort. For services to the community.
- Patricia Randal Heath, of Newtown. For services to the community.
- Thomas William Hobbs, of Cowes. For services to the local government and the community.
- Jeanne Cathcart Iser, of Bendigo. For services to Red Cross.
- Norman Edward Jakes, of Mount Waverley. For services to the community.
- Roy Alexander King, of South Ballarat. For services to the community.
- Mischa Kogan, of Toorak. For services to music.
- Leonard Munro, of Parkville. For services to the University of Melbourne.
- Thomas Tully Orde, of Mount Macedon. For services to local government and the community.
- Doris Orr, of Oakleigh. For services to the Red Cross.
- Peggie Park, of Strathmore. For services to sport.
- James Wilson Pettitt, of Lara. For services to local government and the community.
- Maurice Leslie Portingale, of Carrum. For services to surf life-saving.
- Rita Ellen Roberts, of Camberwell. For services to the community.
- John Gottlieb Rothe, of Little Hampton. For services to local government and the community.
- Eve Sher, of Toorak. For services to the community.
- Mervyn George Dentry Simpson, of Huntingdale. For services to music.
- Eileen Jessie Wheeler, of North Fitzroy. For services to the community.
- Valmai Maud Palmer Wright, of Carrum. For services to the Spastic Children's Society.

State of Queensland

- Arthur James Adams, of Dalby. For services to sport.
- Rebecca Jane Bains, of Townsville. For services to mothers and children.
- Annibale Boccabella, of New Farm. For charitable works on behalf of migrants and for Italian families.
- Jane Boyce, of Ashgrove. For services to education.
- Ernest James Bull, of Enoggera. For services as a Crown employee.
- Florence Mary Clark, of Aspley. For services to the community.
- Eunice Ellen Cornish, of East Ipswich. For services to the community.
- Violet Green, of Dalby. For services to returned servicemen and women.
- Mervyn Adrian Wallace Hamilton, of Eidsvold. For services to the community.
- Laura Johnson, of Mount Isa. For services to the aged.
- Francis John Desmond Lynam or Stafford. For services to the sport of amateur cycling.
- Nancy Jones, of Ipswich. For services to the community.
- Alice Mary Meldon, of Chinchilla. For services to returned servicemen and women.
- Eva Muller, of Monto. For services to the community.
- William Joseph Nowlan, of Hendra. For community services in many fields.
- Margaret Agnes Osborne, of Roma. For services to the community.
- Alfred Ernest Pepper, of Aspley. For services to the community.
- Ellen Eliza Rippin, of St. George. For services to the welfare of children.
- Tristan Raimund Wielaert, of New Farm. For services to the handicapped.

State of Western Australia

- Reginald Blackburn, of Mandurah. For services to football administration.
- Kathleen Marian Brockway, of Nedlands. For services to the community.
- Horace Walter Day, of Coodanup. For services to charities.
- William Dob Son, of Lathlain. For voluntary services.
- Edith Donaldson, of Bunbury. For voluntary services.
- Olga Emily Hotchin, of Scarborough. For services to the community.
- Arthur Ralph Kelly, of Pemberton. For services to the community.
- Margaret Georgia Lang, of Katanning. For services to the community.
- Colin Kingsley Malcolm, of Nedlands. For services to the community.
- George Morrow Scott, of Mandurah. For services to volunteer fire fighting and the community.
- Godfrey Reginald Wright, of Maylands. For services to the community.

=== Royal Red Cross ===
Royal Red Cross, First Class

- Lieutenant Colonel (Acting Colonel) Peggy Gwendoline Burge (457646), Queen Alexandra's Royal Army Nursing Corps.
- Lieutenant Colonel Margaret Jean McDermott (438478), Queen Alexandra's Royal Army Nursing Corps.

Royal Red Cross (Second Class)

- Pamela Kate Dowling, Superintending Sister, Queen Alexandra's Royal Naval Nursing Service.
- Fleet Chief Medical Technician George William Hampton, M81304SY.
- Squadron Officer Alice Mary Orr (407992), Princess Mary's Royal Air Force Nursing Service.
- Flight Lieutenant Anthony Bowns (4169504), RAF.

=== Air Force Cross ===
Royal Navy

- Lieutenant Commander Keith Martin Cologne Simmons.

Royal Air Force

- Wing Commander Robert Lewis Barcilon (607508).
- Squadron Leader Peter Backhouse Curtin (607717).
- Squadron Leader John David Leonard Feesey (4231226).
- Squadron Leader Richard John Howard (607967).
- Squadron Leader Peter Coulson Norriss (2615294).
- Squadron Leader Brian Arthur Wright (4232366).
- Flight Lieutenant Colin John Cruickshanks (608498).
- Flight Lieutenant Robert Samuel Howley (508045).
- Flight Lieutenant Anthony Eugene Peter Webb (4231305).

=== Queen's Police Medal ===
England and Wales

- Cyril James Anderton, Chief Constable, Greater Manchester Police.
- David Hall, Chief Constable, Humberside Police.
- Charles McLachlan, Chief Constable, Nottinghamshire Constabulary.
- Cecil Francis Gutsell, Deputy Chief Constable, South Yorkshire Police.
- Colin Robert Jones, Deputy Chief Constable, Wiltshire Constabulary.
- Alfred Patterson, Assistant Chief Constable (Administration), Cleveland Constabulary.
- Harry John Robinson, Assistant Chief Constable (Crime), West Midlands Police.
- Ashley George Warman, Assistant Chief Constable, Kent County Constabulary.
- Bernard Joseph Allsop, Commander, Metropolitan Police.
- Donald Neesham, Commander, Metropolitan Police.
- Robert Donald Saunders, Commander, Metropolitan Police.
- Ronald Charles Steventon, Commander, Metropolitan Police.
- John Toogood, Commander, Metropolitan Police.
- Joseph Spencer Brown, Divisional Chief Superintendent, West Midlands Police.
- Thomas Henry Carter, Chief Superintendent, Cheshire Constabulary.
- Harold Wright, Chief Superintendent, Staffordshire Police.
- Maureen Elsie Falloon, Superintendent, Derbyshire Constabulary.

Scotland

- John Henry Orr, OBE, Chief Constable, Lothian and Borders Police.
- George Innes Henderson, Superintendent, Northern Constabulary.

Northern Ireland

- David James Davidson, Detective Sergeant, Royal Ulster Constabulary.

Isle of Man

- Frank Weedon, Chief Constable, Isle of Man Constabulary.

Overseas Territories

- Rex Kynaston Jones, Chief of Police, Royal Virgin Islands Police Force.
- Peter Thomas Moor, CPM, Assistant Commissioner of Police, Royal Hong Kong Police Force.
- Richard Edgar Quine, CPM, Chief Superintendent of Police, Royal Hong Kong Police Force.

Australian States

- Noel Hamilton Bowden, Superintendent, 1st Class, New South Wales Police Force.
- Frank Leslie Ferris, Superintendent, 1st Class, New South Wales Police Force.
- Grant Fryer, Superintendent, 3rd Class, New South Wales Police Force.
- Kenneth Charles Jensen, Assistant Commissioner, New South Wales Police Force.
- George Francis Gell Marshall, Superintendent, 1st Class, New South Wales Police Force.
- Allan Mitchell King Power, Superintendent, 3rd Class, New South Wales Police Force.
- Albert Harold Trevenar, Superintendent, 3rd Class, New South Wales Police Force.
- Royce Ephraim Whitelaw, Superintendent, 3rd Class, New South Wales Police Force.
- John Peter Whitfield, Superintendent, 2nd Class, New South Wales Police Force.
- Ian Murray Adams, Chief Superintendent, Victoria Police Force.
- Michael Clifford, Superintendent, Victoria Police Force.
- Robert Alexander McNaughton, Chief Superintendent, Victoria Police Force.
- Gordon Frederick Marchesi, Chief Superintendent, Victoria Police Force.
- Arthur Hugh O'Meara, Chief Superintendent, Victoria Police Force.
- James Joseph Ryan, Chief Superintendent, Victoria Police Force.
- Mark Dougall Beattie, Superintendent, Queensland Police Force.
- William John Galligan, Superintendent, Queensland Police Force.
- Kenneth Johnson, Inspector, Queensland Police Force.
- Terence Murray Lewis, GM, Commissioner, Queensland Police Force.
- Daniel Thomas McGrath, Inspector, Queensland Police Force.
- Bruce John Brennan, Superintendent, Western Australia Police Force.
- William Thomas Reginald Connolly, Superintendent, Western Australia Police Force.

=== Queen's Fire Service Medal ===
England and Wales

- Leslie Ernest Johnson, Chief Fire Officer, Somerset Fire Brigade.
- Melville Wilfred Willis, Chief Fire Officer, Suffolk Fire Brigade.
- Robert Basil Blackburn, Chief Fire Officer, West Sussex Fire Brigade.
- Ronald John Homer Miller, Assistant Chief' Fire Officer (Chief Staff Officer), London Fire Brigade.
- Stanley, Ernest Edmunds, Senior Divisional Officer, Nottinghamshire Fire Brigade.
- Jack Moss, Deputy Chief Officer, New South Wales Fire Brigade.

Scotland

- Richard James Knowlton, FIFireE, Firemaster, Strathclyde Fire Brigade.

=== Colonial Police Medal ===
- Derek William Bere, Chief Inspector of Police, Royal Hong Kong Police Force.
- Derek Marlborough Claassen, Superintendent of Police, Royal Hong Kong Auxiliary Police Force.
- David John Edwards, Chief Inspector of Police, Royal Hong Kong Police Force.
- Alvin Carcorington Goodwin, Inspector of Police, Royal Antigua Police Force.
- Cecil Ambroise James, Inspector, St. Lucia Fire Service.
- Fitz Gerald Joseph, Sergeant, Royal Saint Lucia Police Force.
- Kim Kong, Principal Fireman, Hong Kong Fire Services.
- Isabella Mitchell Lee, Inspector of Police, Bermuda Police Force.
- Oi-lin Leung Kwok, Station Sergeant, Royal Hong Kong Police Force.
- Cho Li, Principal Fireman, Hong Kong Fire Services.
- Shiu-kwong Loo, Senior Inspector of Police, Royal Hong Kong Auxiliary Police Force.
- Shing-wan Mak, Sergeant, Royal Hong Kong Police, Force.
- Robert St. Martin, Acting Inspector of Police, Royal Saint Lucia Police Force.
- Frederic Soaki, Superintendent of Police, Solomon Islands Police Force.
- Augusto Maria Mathias de Souza, lately Station Sergeant, Royal Hong Kong Auxiliary Police Force.
- Wah Tam, Senior Fireman, Hong Kong Fire Services.
- Ulrich Joseph Williams, Inspector of Police, Royal Turks and Caicos Islands Police Force.
- Hiu-shan Wong, Station Sergeant, Royal Hong Kong Police Force.
- Sik-yuen Wong, Inspector of Police, Royal Hong Kong Police Force.

=== Queen's Commendation for Valuable Service in the Air ===
Royal Air Force

- Wing Commander Bryan Edward Burton (3116943).
- Squadron Leader Anthony Preston Bell (4231262).
- Squadron Leader Brian Richard Hoskins (4232225).
- Squadron Leader Harry Mitford Liddell (1808535).
- Squadron Leader Russell Pengelly, AFC (608519).
- Squadron Leader John Arkley Prideaux (4230428).
- Squadron Leader John Sheldon Redding (583236).
- Squadron Leader Jeremy Michael Yates, AFC (2617091).
- Flight Lieutenant David Brian Ainge (608392).
- Flight Lieutenant Dudley Hugh Bennett (608201).
- Flight Lieutenant Keith Gilbert Blatchford (4230964).
- Flight Lieutenant John Leslie Langlands Brown (4220170).
- Flight Lieutenant Michael William Paul Chapple (2615415).
- Flight Lieutenant Ian Gratham Jacobsen (015961), Royal Australian Air Force.
- Flight Lieutenant Derek Louis Jones (4230184).
- Flight Lieutenant Geoffrey Harold Leeming (4231041).
- Flight Lieutenant William Richard Lewis (608444).
- Flight Lieutenant Eric Charles Sadler (4086660).
- Flight Lieutenant Charles William Thompson (4231758).
- Flight Lieutenant David Webb (4232859).
- Flight Lieutenant Richard William Alfred Woodhead (608034).

United Kingdom

- Edward Phil Church, Senior Inspector of Accidents, Accidents Investigation Branch, Department of Trade.
- Bernard John Clack, Captain, Boeing 737 Commander, Britannia Airways.
- Michael John Colgate, Senior Engineer Officer, Flight Engineering Superintendent 747s, British Airways.
- Andrew Philip Shetler Jones, Test Pilot, British Aerospace (HSA).
- David Kemp, Manager, Navigation and Operations Planning, British Caledonian Airways Ltd.
- John Blain McEwen, lately Senior Line Training Captain, Trident Flight 3B, British Airways.
- Keith Murray Perrin, Chief of Test Flight, Airworthiness Division, Civil Aviation Authority.

== Canada ==
=== Appointments ===
- Her Majesty The Queen to be Colonel-in-Chief, Canadian Forces Military Engineers Branch.
- Her Majesty Queen Elizabeth The Queen Mother to be Colonel-in-Chief of the Canadian Forces Medical Services.
- His Royal Highness The Prince of Wales to be Colonel-in-Chief of Lord Strathcona's Horse (Royal Canadians), the Royal Winnipeg Rifles, The Royal Regiment of Canada, and the Air Reserve Group of Air Command.
- Her Royal Highness The Princess Anne, Mrs Mark Phillips, to be Colonel-in-Chief of Canadian Forces Communications and Electronics Branch and The Grey and Simcoe Foresters.
- His Royal Highness The Duke Of Kent to be Colonel-in-Chief The Lorne Scots Regiment.
- Her Royal Highness Princess Alexandra, The Honourable Mrs. Angus Ogilvy, to be Colonel-in-Chief The Canadian Scottish Regiment (Princess Mary's).

== Australia ==
=== Appointments ===
- His Royal Highness The Prince of Wales to be Colonel-in-Chief, Royal Australian Armoured Corps.
- Her Royal Highness The Princess Anne, Mrs Mark Phillips, to be Colonel-in-Chief, Royal Australian Corps of Signals.
- Her Royal Highness Princess Alice, Duchess of Gloucester to be Colonel-in-Chief, Royal Australian Corps of Transport.

=== Knight Bachelor ===
- Samuel Gerald Wood Burston, OBE, of Casterton Victoria. For distinguished service to primary industry.
- Eustace John Cameron, CBE, of Ross, Tasmania. For distinguished service to the community.
- Clarence Waldemar Harders, OBE, of Deakin, Australian Capital Territory. For distinguished public service.
- Donald James Hibberd, OBE, of South Yarra, Victoria. For distinguished service to industry.
- Professor Edward Stuart Reginald Hughes, CBE, of Malvern, Victoria. For distinguished service to medicine in the field of surgery.
- The Honourable Mr. Justice Percy Ernest Joske, CMG, of Strathfield, New South Wales. For distinguished parliamentary service and services to law and to the community.
- Walter McEllister Leonard, DFC, of Clontarf, New South Wales. For distinguished service to industry.
- Alan Walsh, of Brighton, Victoria. For distinguished service to science.

=== Order of Saint Michael and Saint George ===
==== Knight Grand Cross of the Order of St Michael and St George (GCMG) ====
- The Right Honourable John Grey Gorton, CH, of Narrabundah, Australian Capital Territory. For eminent service to the Parliament and to Australia.
- The Right Honourable William McMahon, CH MP, of Bellevue Hill, New South Wales. For eminent service to the Parliament and to Australia.

==== Companion of the Order of St Michael and St George (CMG) ====
- The Honourable Kenneth William Asprey, QC, of St. Ives, New South Wales. For service to government.
- The Honourable Mr. Justice Robert Marsden Hope, of Lindfield, New South Wales. For service to government.
- Robert James Furlon McInerney, of Castlecrag, New South Wales. For service to medicine.
- George Polites, MBE, of Cheltenham, Victoria. For service to industrial relations.

=== Order of the British Empire ===
==== Knight Commander of the Order of the British Empire (KBE) ====
Military Division

- Air Marshal James Anthony Rowland, DFC AFC (022056), Chief of the Air Staff.

Civil Division

- His Eminence Cardinal James Darcy Freeman, of Sydney, New South Wales.

==== Commander of the Order of the British Empire (CBE) ====
Civil Division

- Richard Bonynge, of Sydney, New South Wales. For service to the performing arts.
- William Callaghan, of Chapman, Australian Capital Territory. For public service and service to industry.
- Charles Kennedy Comans, OBE QC, of Forrest, Australian Capital Territory. For public service.
- Francis Eugene Galbally, of East Ivanhoe, Victoria. For service to the community.
- Eber Frederick Lane, of Westleigh, New South Wales. For public service.
- Thomas Molomby, MBE, of East Malvern, Victoria. For service to law.
- Isaac Richard Norman, MBE, of Killara, New South Wales. For service to commerce in the field of banking.
- Margery Scott-Young, of Lane Cove, New South Wales. For service to medicine.

==== Officer of the Order of the British Empire (OBE) ====
Civil Division

- Michael Anthony, of South Coogee, New South Wales. For service to medicine.
- Reginald Edward Bailey, DSO DFC, of North Balwyn, Victoria. For public service.
- Barbara Mary Chisholm, MBE, of Darlinghurst, New South Wales. For service to education.
- John Coombe, of Macquarie, Australian Capital Territory. For public service.
- Roy Daniel, of Campbell, Australian Capital Territory. For public service.
- John Grant Denton, of West Pymble, New South Wales. For service to the church.
- Leonard Bertram Dommett, of Beaumaris, Victoria. For service to the performing arts.
- Rolf Harris, MBE, of London, England. For service to the performing arts.
- Ian Conrad Heinz, of Glen Iris, Victoria. For public service.
- Austin Stewart Holmes, St. Ives, New South Wales. For public service.
- Laurence Reginald Killeen, of Narrabundah, Australian Capital Territory. For public service.
- Edward Stanley Lightly, of Griffith, Australian Capital Territory. For public service.
- Yvonne McComb, of Hamilton, Queensland. For service to the community.
- Arthur William McMichael, of Weston, Australian Capital Territory. For public service.
- Gwenyth Valmai Meredith, MBE (G. V. Harrison), of Berrima, New South Wales. For service to the arts.
- The Reverend David Roy Merritt, of Blackburn, Victoria. For service to the community.
- Robert Money, of Balwyn, Victoria. For service to the community.
- Lyndon Charles Noakes, of Red Hill, Australian Capital Territory. For public service.
- Robert Cecil York Norton, of Killara, New South Wales. For services to dentistry.
- Geoffrey Penwill Parsons, of London, England. For service to the performing arts.
- John Gowar Ritchie, of East St. Kilda, Victoria. For service to technology.
- John Robson, of Epping, New South Wales. For service to the community.
- William Sloan, of Burleigh Heads, Queensland. For service to industry.
- Professor Derek Edward Tribe, of Surrey Hills, Victoria. For service to education.
- Peter Francis Underhill, of Chelmer, Queensland. For service to the community and to international relations.
- Gerald Unkles, of Balwyn, Victoria. For public service.
- Richard Minchin Ure, MBE, of Blackburn, Victoria. For public service.
- Peter Provis Warrick, of Armidale, New South Wales. For service to politics.
- Russell John Whitmont, of Killara, New South Wales. For service to industry.
- Guthrie Edward Melville Wilson, MC, of Bellevue Hill, New South Wales. For service to education.
- William Worth, of Christmas Island, Indian Ocean. For public service.

==== Member of the Order of the British Empire (MBE) ====
Military Division

- Superintendent Donald Copp (02284), Royal Australian Navy.
- Lieutenant Commander Frederick Anthony Bush (01835), Royal Australian Navy.
- Lieutenant Commander Jack William Levy (0682), Royal Australian Navy.
- Lieutenant Commander Rodney Trevor Nott (02327), Royal Australian Navy.
- Major John Basson Humffray (29692), Royal Australian Corps of Transport.
- Major Alfred James Larson (18088), Royal Australian Infantry.
- Major Peter Edward Morriss McGuinness (2101794), Royal Australian Infantry.
- Major George Francis Powell (33340), Royal Australian Signals.
- Major Gordon Kay Richardson (1822), Royal Australian Electrical and Mechanical Engineers.
- Major Terence John Smith (276640), Royal Australian Infantry.
- Captain Bruce Davies (37393), Royal Australian Infantry. Royal Australian Air Force
- Squadron Leader Donald Gordon Dickie (046018), Royal Australian Air Force.
- Squadron Leader Hans Joachim Fuhrmann (061134), Royal Australian Air Force.
- Squadron Leader Frank Korbl (0316899), Royal Australian Air Force.
- Squadron Leader Leslie Charles Watts (0218879), Royal Australian Air Force.

Civil Division

- Alderman Henry Robert Seton Anderson, of Ryde, New South Wales. For service to local government and to the community.
- Peter Nicholas Aroney, of Coorparoo, Queensland. For service to the community.
- Werner Bae, of Castlerag, New South Wales. For service to the performing arts.
- Matron Daphne Camilla Barrett (Mrs Frater), of Narrabri, New South Wales. For service to nursing.
- Alderman Ernest John Beaver, of Queanbeyan, New South Wales. For service to local government and to the community.
- Eric Oscar Boyson, of Waramanga, Australian Capital Territory. For service to the community.
- Sybil Joyce Boyson, of Waramanga, Australian Capital Territory. For service to the community.
- John William Chegwyn, of Botany, New South Wales. For service to sport.
- The Reverend Ronald Charles Coleman, of Waverley, New South Wales. For service to the church and to the community.
- Raymond Arthur Collins, of Keilor East, Victoria. For public service.
- John Bede Commins, of Braddon, Australian Capital Territory. For service to journalism.
- Dorothy Tidmarsh Coultas, of Brighton, South Australia. For service to the community.
- Francis Hugh Cushing, of Chermside, Queensland. For service to the community.
- Ann Patricia Dalgarno, of Red Hill, Australian Capital Territory. For service to the community.
- Sister Mary Dorothea Devine, of Darlinghurst, New South Wales. For service to nursing.
- Madena Davis Douglas, of Waitara, New South Wales. For service to the welfare of veterans.
- Phillip Laurence Ferrier, of Glenalta, South Australia. For service to the community.
- Barbara Frances Garrett, of Thorngate, South Australia. For service to the community.
- Allan Gray, of Mansfield, Queensland. For public service.
- Judith Green, of Burradoo, New South Wales. For service to the community.
- George Daniel Harris, of Kalamandra, Western Australia. For public service.
- John Norman Harvey DFC, of Cronulla, New South Wales. For service to the community.
- Deaconess Winifred Margaret Hilliard, of Ernabella, South Australia. For service to Aboriginal welfare.
- Edward Henry Hincksman, of Griffith, Australian Capital Territory. For public service.
- Stanley Bland Hone, of Marks Point, New South Wales. For service to aviation.
- Leonard Iles, of Glen Osmond, South Australia. For service to the community.
- Councillor Maurice George Jarvis, of Dandenong, Victoria. For service to local government and to the community.
- Lindsay Lewis Lock, of Mentone, Victoria. For public service.
- Robert Emmanuel McClintock, of Muselbrook, New South Wales. For service to the community.
- Alderman Norman Lang McKellar, of Tamworth, New South Wales. For service to local government, and to the community.
- Alderman Iris Ruby Macdonald, of Henley South, South Australia. For service to local government and to the community.
- The Reverend George Stanley Martin, of Largs Bay, South Australia. For service to the community.
- Henry Francis Monaghan, of Eastwood, New South Wales. For service to technology.
- Wallis Whitefield Moore, of Clayfield, Queensland. For public service.
- Margaret Mort, of Newcastle, New South Wales. For service to occupational therapy.
- Francis Claude Murphy, Northcote, Victoria. For service to the community.
- Jessie Ross Murray, Carlingford, New South Wales. For service to the performing arts.
- Gordon Henry Neill, of Newport, Victoria. For public service.
- Norman Etwell Newton, of New Town, Tasmania. For public service.
- Alderman William Robert Nicholas, of Manly, New South Wales. For service to local government and the community.
- Bruna Nobili, of Joondanna, Western Australia. For service to the community.
- Theo Notaras, of Campbell, Australian Capital Territory. For service to the community.
- Dr Francis Sherlock Pearle, of Box Hill, Victoria. For public service.
- Dorothy Philp Pearce, of Lower Sandy Bay, Tasmania. For service to the community.
- The Reverend John Perkins, of Lismore, New South Wales. For service to the church.
- Leslie Phenna, of Yokine, Western Australia. For service to the welfare of veterans.
- Kevin Renton Power, of Forrest, Australian Capital Territory. For service to journalism.
- Henry Alfred Ruffell, of Eltham, Victoria. For public service.
- Grahame Yorke Dalley Scarlett, of Palm Beach, New South Wales. For service to the community.
- William Charles Edward Shier, of Meltham, Western Australia. For public service.
- John McIlweaith Smith, of Merimbula, New South Wales. For service to the community.
- Alan John Sweeting, of Narrabundah, Australian Capital Territory. For public service.
- James Linsey Tandy, of Torrens, Australian Capital Territory. For public service.
- Thomas Tycho, of Seaforth, New South Wales. For service to the performing arts.
- John Robert Maxwell Walters, of Dubbo, New South Wales. For service to the community and to local government.
- Mervyn Edward Werrell, of Abbotsford, New South Wales. For service to the community and to local government.

=== Companion of the Imperial Service Order (ISO) ===
- Ronald Ralph Gray, of Clontarf, New South Wales, Deputy Commissioner of Taxation.
- John Langford Knight, of Pearce, Australian Capital Territory. Former Deputy-Controller, Department of Productivity.
- Archibald Wallace Nelmes, of Pymble, New South Wales. Former Assistant Secretary, Department of Administrative Services.
- John Thomas Smith, Australian Embassy, Washington D.C., U.S.A.

=== British Empire Medal (BEM) ===
Military Division

- Warrant Officer Raymond Laverty (R53897), Royal Australian Navy.
- Chief Petty Officer Ralph Norman (R53209), Royal Australian Navy.
- Chief Petty Officer Norman William Swinnerton (R38092), Royal Australian Navy.
- Staff Sergeant (Temporary WO II) Reginald Alexander Palmer (2137584), Royal Australian Armoured Corps.
- Sergeant Alexander Francis Johns (1202011), Royal Australian Armoured Corps.
- Sergeant Kevin John Witherow (18493), Royal Australian Army Medical Corps.
- Lance Corporal Darryl Rex Miels (45663), Royal Australian Engineers.
- Flight Sergeant John Patrick Doran (A61016), Royal Australian Air Force.
- Sergeant Ronald Feudoloff (A41545), Royal Australian Air Force.
- Sergeant John Alexander Henson (A17445), Royal Australian Air Force.

Civil Division

- Reginald Wallace Bailey, of Spotswood, Victoria. For public service.
- Florence Caroline Ballhausen, of Roseville, New South Wales. For service to the community.
- Martha Margaret Susan Barany, of Burwood, New South Wales. For service to the community.
- Donald Keeling Berridge, of Salisbury, South Australia. For public service.
- Leslie William Joseph Bond, of Eastwood, New South Wales. For public service.
- Eileen Marjorie Bowker, of Roseville, New South Wales. For public service.
- Paul Martin Boyce, of Fanny Bay, Darwin, Northern Territory. For public service.
- Irene Mary Burke, of Wavell Heights, Queensland. For public service.
- Amy May Byriel, of Toowoomba, Queensland. For service to the community.
- John Douglas Chamberlain, of Beaumaris, Victoria. For public service.
- Harrold Owen George Chappell, of South Plympton, South Australia. For public service.
- Sister Mary Sabina (Miss Conway), of Burnie, Tasmania. For service to education.
- Heather Ray Coogan, of Tenterfield, New South Wales. For service to the community.
- Lyle Adele Dart, of Nelson Bay, New South Wales. For service to the community.
- Wendy Marie Ey, of North Adelaide, South Australia. For service to sport.
- Stephen Thomas Filmer, of Cann River, Victoria. For service to the community.
- Keith Memory Firth, of Lenah Valley, Tasmania. For public service.
- Margaret Eileen Fry, of Northcote, Victoria. For public service.
- Mabel Lucretia Fuller, of Fitzroy, Victoria. For public service.
- Annie Aileen Gaffney, of Wollar, New South Wales. For public service.
- Emily Mary Greenhalgh, of Singleton, New South Wales. For public service.
- Mavis Jean Hammersley, of Forrest, Australian Capital Territory. For public service.
- Lilian Emily Hillyer, of Woy Woy Bay, New South Wales. For service to the community.
- Raymond Arthur Hoffman, of Tanunda, South Australia. For service to primary industry and to the community.
- Walter William Edward Honey, of Concord, New South Wales. For public service.
- Kenneth George Lanham, of Heathmont, Victoria. For public service.
- Cecil Henry Luckhurst, of Hunters Hill, New South Wales. For public service.
- John Walter Macauley, of Macquarie, Australian Capital Territory. For public service.
- Joyce Rita McCombe, of Casterton, Victoria. For service to the community.
- Alexander Wray McDonald, of Coogee, New South Wales. For public service.
- Albert Ernest Magor, of Mont Albert, Victoria. For public service.
- Bernard Curren Masterson, of Kangaroo Flat, Victoria. For public service.
- Victor James Meehan, of Shelley, Western Australian For public service.
- Desma Lorraine M'Eek, of Streatham, Victoria. For public service.
- John William Seymour Mitchell, of Henley Beach, South Australia. For public service.
- Ross Moody, of North Brighton, South Australia. For public service.
- Roger Clifton Moore., of Warialda, New South Wales. For service to the community.
- David Neagle, of Norfolk Island. For service to the community.
- Lillian Margaret Nichols, of Cooma, New South Wales. For service to the community.
- Athol Wilson Noble, of Gerringpng, New South Wales. For service to the community.
- Andrew William Palm, Eden Hills, South Australia. For public service.
- Leslie James Hulbert Parker, of Pialba, Queensland. For public service.
- Eric Thomas Parr, of Campbell, Australian Capital Territory. For public service.
- Imelda Theresa Payne, of Somerton Park, South Australia. For public service.
- Norma Catherine Pitscheneder, of Darwin. Northern Territory. For service to the community.
- Beryl Ellen Quartel, of Narrabundah, Australian Capital Territory. For service to the community.
- Vincent Trevor Ranson, of Trevallyn, Tasmania. For public service.
- Kenneth Ivan Watson Roberts, of Holden Hill, South Australia. For public service.
- Gertrude Emily Salcole, of Nyngan, New South Wales. For public service.
- Leslie Arthur Sayers, of Camberwell, Victoria. For service to the community.
- Janet Strang Stevenson, of McKinnon, Victoria. For public service.
- Colin Cyril Telfer, of Griffith, Australian Capital Territory. For public service.
- Councillor Kevin Bertram John Thomas, of Hamilton, Victoria. For service to the community and to local government.
- Edna Mary Thompson, of Reid, Australian Capital Territory. For public service.
- Maud Beatrice Turley, of Lithgow, New South Wales. For service to the community.
- Lily Wainwright, of Smithtan, Tasmania. For service to the community.
- William Alfred George Watson, of Berowra, New South Wales. For service to the community.
- Francis Werner, of West Footscray, Victoria. For public service.
- Mervyn Williams, of Coorow, Western Australia. For service to the welfare of veterans.
- Henry William Wiltshire, of Mossman, Queensland. For public service.

=== Royal Red Cross (RRC) ===
- Group Officer Joan Dorothy Kirwin (N39728), Royal Australian Air Force Nursing Service.

==== Associate of the Royal Red Cross (ARRC) ====
- Lieutenant Colonel Helen Francis Adamson (F3637), Royal Australian Army Nursing Corps.
- Major Alma Therese Straube (F12467), Royal Australian Army Nursing Corps.

=== Air Force Cross (AFC) ===
- Lieutenant Commander Robert Reran Waldron (02027), Royal Australian Navy.
- Major Graeme Roderick Maughan (16896), Australian Army Aviation Corps.
- Wing Commander Baillie John McKenny (0216393), Royal Australian Air Force.
- Squadron Leader Reginald John Meissner (0110300), Royal Australian Air Force.
- Squadron Leader Allen Alfred Page (0315723), Royal Australian Air Force.
- Flight Lieutenant Christopher Tames Hancock (0222455), Royal Australian Air Force.
- Flight Lieutenant Ian Mallett (0224239), Royal Australian Air Force.
- Flight Lieutenant John Randolph Sampson (0222354), Royal Australian Air Force.

=== Queen's Commendation for Valuable Service in the Air ===
- Captain Peter Allan Muir (1200785), Australian Army Aviation Corps.

=== Queen's Police Medal ===
- Fred Samuel Luther, Senior Inspector, Commonwealth Police Force.

=== Queen's Fire Services Medal ===
- William Charles Harris, Director, Fire Services, Department of Transport.

== Barbados ==
=== Knight Bachelor ===
- Kenneth Lamonte Stuart, Medical Adviser, Commonwealth Secretariat. For services to medical education in the West Indies in particular and the Commonwealth in general.

=== Queen's Police Medal ===
- George Lincoln Reid, CPM, Commissioner, Royal Barbados Police Force.

== Mauritius ==
=== Knight Bachelor ===
- Charles Henri Raymond Hein, QC. For outstanding services to the legal profession and to the country generally.

=== Order of Saint Michael and Saint George ===
==== Companion of the Order of St Michael and St George (CMG) ====
- Dayendranath Burrenchobay, CVO, Secretary to the Cabinet and Head of the Civil Service.

=== Order of the British Empire ===
==== Commander of the Order of the British Empire (CBE) ====
Civil Division

- Joseph Albert Juppin De Fondaumiere, MVO QPM CPM, Adviser, Road Traffic Advisory Unit.

==== Officer of the Order of the British Empire (OBE) ====
Civil Division

- Joseph Yves Appassamy, lately Comptroller of Customs.
- Deokeenanun Bacha. For voluntary social work.
- Pierre Patrick Balmanno, lately Legal Secretary, Attorney-General's Office.
- Shri Krishnulall Oupuddhaye Jankee. For voluntary social work.

==== Member of the Order of the British Empire (MBE) ====
Civil Division

- Michel Phoebus Bazerque. For services to primary education.
- Soogrim Jaulim. For voluntary service in the field of youth activities.
- Gajadhur Joory. For voluntary services to the cooperative movement and in social work.
- Permal Rungala Madiah. For voluntary services to the co-operative movement and in social work.
- Tayyab Tegally. For long and devoted public service.

=== Mauritius Police Medal ===
- Amadkhan Hyderkhan, MBE, Deputy Commissioner, Mauritius Police Force.
- Ramsing Kusrutsingh, Assistant Superintendent, Mauritius Police Force,
- Louis Jose Paul, Assistant Superintendent, Mauritius Police Force.
- Mohun Ramsurrun, Superintendent, Mauritius Police Force.

== Fiji ==
=== Knight Bachelor ===
- Mr. Justice Clifford Grant, Chief Justice of Fiji.
- Robert Munro, CBE, President of the Senate.

=== Order of the British Empire ===
==== Commander of the Order of the British Empire (CBE) ====
Civil Division

- Vishnu Deo Prasad, Secretary of the Public Service Commission.
- Berenado Vunibobo. Permanent Representative of Fiji at the United Nations.

==== Officer of the Order of the British Empire (OBE) ====
Civil Division

- Doris Leys, Director of the Fiji Red Cross Society.
- Ratu George Seruitawake Mataika. For long and faithful Government Service.
- Hari Punja. For services to the community.

==== Member of the Order of the British Empire (MBE) ====
Military Division

- Major Josefa Lopeti Volaubalavu, ED, Fiji Infantry Regiment.

Civil Division

- Joveci Gavoka. For services to the trade union movement.
- John Rama Naidu Rao. For services to the community.
- Margaret Grace Sotutu. For services to education and the community.

== Bahamas ==
=== Knight Bachelor ===
- Clifford Darling. For distinguished public service.
- Randol Francis Fawkes. For services to the trade union movement and the community.

=== Order of Saint Michael and Saint George ===
==== Companion of the Order of St Michael and St George (CMG) ====
- Rodney Ezekial Bain, Secretary to the Cabinet.

=== Order of the British Empire ===
==== Commander of the Order of the British Empire (CBE) ====
Civil Division

- The Reverend Arthur Samuel Colebrook, President of the Bahamas Baptist Missionary and Educational Convention.

==== Officer of the Order of the British Empire (OBE) ====
Civil Division

- Ralph Eugene Knowles. For public service.
- Frederick Alfred Munnings. For services to music and entertainment.
- Alexis Nihon. For services to charity.

==== Member of the Order of the British Empire (MBE) ====
Civil Division

- Agnes Augusta Archer. For services to education and the community.
- Lawrence Alexander Tinker. For services to the community.

=== British Empire Medal (BEM) ===
Civil Division

- Elias Bullard. For services to the community.
- Blanche Herlean Gray. For services to the community.
- Millicent Louise Symonette. For services to education.

=== Queen's Police Medal ===
- Avery Evans Ferguson. Assistant Commissioner. Royal Bahamas Police Force.
- Edney Hanlon Johnson, Chief Superintendent (Director of Fire Services), Royal Bahamas Police Force
- Courtney Vernon Strachan, CPM, Assistant Commissioner, Royal Bahamas Police Force.
- Lawrence Whitfield Major, CPM, Assistant Cornmissioner, Royal Bahamas Police Force.

== Grenada ==
=== Knight Bachelor ===
- The Right Honourable Eric Matthew Gairy, Prime Minister of Grenada.

=== Order of the British Empire ===
==== Commander of the Order of the British Empire (CBE) ====
Civil Division

- Benjamin Nathaniel Davis, For services to commerce.

=== British Empire Medal (BEM) ===
Civil Division

- Roslyn Balthazard. For services to the community.
- Doris Carter. For services to agriculture.
- Fena Vivian Carriman. For services to the community.

=== Queen's Police Medal ===
- McDonald Anthony Simon, Assistant Superintendent Grenada Police Force.
- Aloysius Silverius Von Wyler, Inspector, Grenada Police Force.

== Papua New Guinea ==
=== Knight Bachelor ===
- The Honourable Mr. Justice William Thomas Prentice, MBE, For service to the law.

=== Order of Saint Michael and Saint George ===
==== Companion of the Order of St Michael and St George (CMG) ====
- The Most Reverend Herman To Paivu. For services to religion.

=== Order of the British Empire ===
==== Commander of the Order of the British Empire (CBE) ====
Military Division

- Brigadier-General Edward Ramu Diro, OBE (82673). For services to the Papua New Guinea Defence Force.

Civil Division

- Mary Kekedo, BEM. For services to the community.
- John William Reilly, CVO MBE, For public service and for organisation of Royal Visits.

==== Officer of the Order of the British Empire (OBE) ====
Military Division

- Lieutenant-Colonel (Provisional Colonel) Kenneth Nora Noga (82675). For services to the Papua New Guinea Defence Force.

Civil Division

- Cecil Abel. For community and public services.
- Brian Bell. For community services.
- Vincent McNamara. For public service.
- The Honourable Donatus Mola, MP. For political services.

==== Member of the Order of the British Empire (MBE) ====
Military Division

- Chief Warrant Officer George Aibo-Medo (854). For services to the Papua New Guinea Defence Force.
- Squadron Leader William Stewart McAlister (017868). For services to the Papua New Guinea Defence Force.
- Warrant Officer Jack Arua Vei (82244). For services to the Papua New Guinea Defence Force.

Civil Division

- Jack Aila. For services to broadcasting.
- Thomas Shacklady, BEM, Chief Inspector, Royal Papua New Guinea Constabulary. For services to music.
- George Tabua. For public service.
- James Yanepa. For services to local government.

=== Companion of the Imperial Service Order (ISO) ===
- Mark Austin Lynch. Secretary to the Cabinet.
- Kevin Joseph White. First Assistant Director (Research and Development) Office of Forests.

=== British Empire Medal (BEM) ===
Military Division

- Sergeant (Provisional Warrant Officer) Oavita Eva (86057), Papua New Guinea Defence Force.

Civil Division

- Frahgi Firambu. For services as a driver to Chief Justices.
- Sergeant-Major Gologo. For meritorious service in the Royal Papua New Guinea Constabulary.
- Senior Constable Herove. For meritorious service in the Royal Papua New Guinea Constabulary.
- Sergeant Komba. For meritorious service in the Royal Papua New Guinea Constabulary.
- Pitalai Lambes. For services to health.
- Senior Sergeant Wangewa. For services as security officer to the Prime Minister.
- Sergeant-Major Henry Yimbin-Tamai. For meritorious service in the Royal Papua New Guinea Constabulary.
