= Inlays and onlays (bookbinding) =

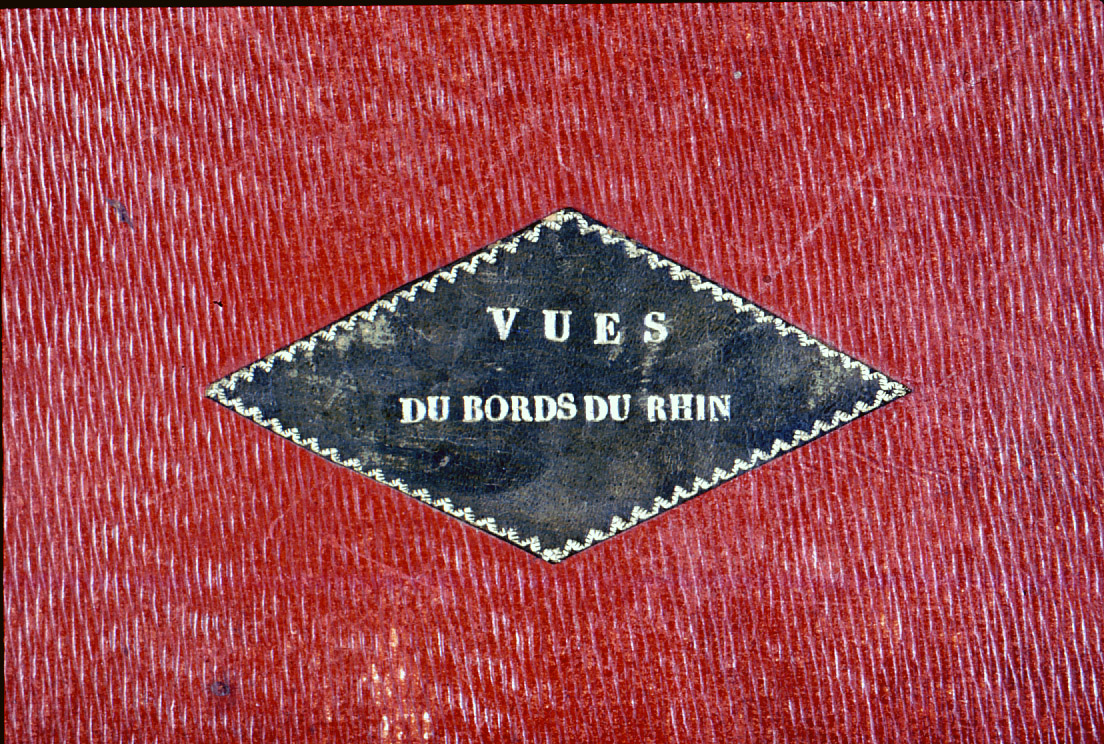
An inlay

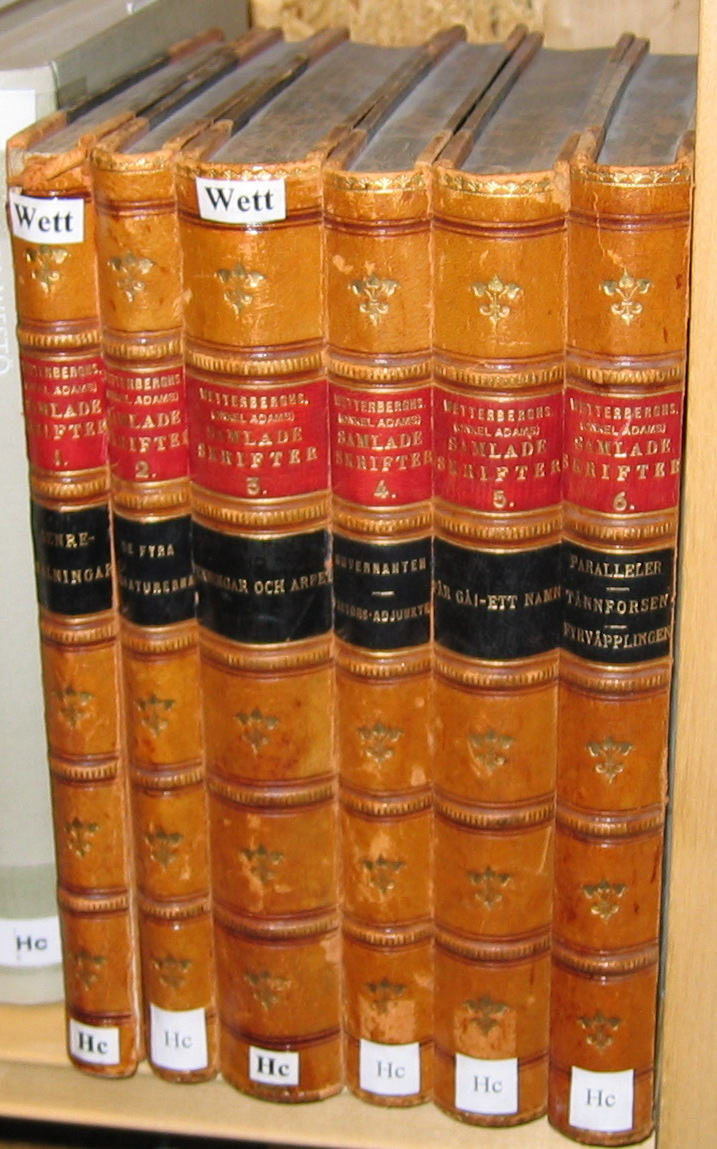
Black and red onlays

In bookbinding, inlays and onlays are pieces of leather adhered to the cover of a book, usually differing in color, grain, or both from the main covering leather. While they are complementary techniques, and may appear similar in their final forms, they are distinct in how they are constructed.

== Inlays ==
Leather inlays, which are similar in form to inlays in woodworking, are shaped pieces of leather the same thickness as the covering leather on a book. A piece of leather the same shape, size, and thickness as the inlay is removed from the covering leather, and the inlay is placed into the resulting space. The edge of the inlay can be tooled, in which case the edge of the inlay is beveled, with the skin side of the leather slightly larger than the flesh side. This gives a smooth, well-supported surface for the impressions of the finishing tools.

== Onlays ==
Often mistaken for inlays, onlays are thin pieces of leather (often less than 0.2 mm) which are adhered over the covering leather on a book. Because of their thinness, onlays are not noticeably raised from the surface of the covering leather. Onlays are adhered to the covering leather with paste or PVA, and their edges are usually, though not universally, tooled over in order to hide any minor irregularities. They are often added to the spine of a book, containing the title and author's name.
