= Bookbinding =

Process of assembling a book

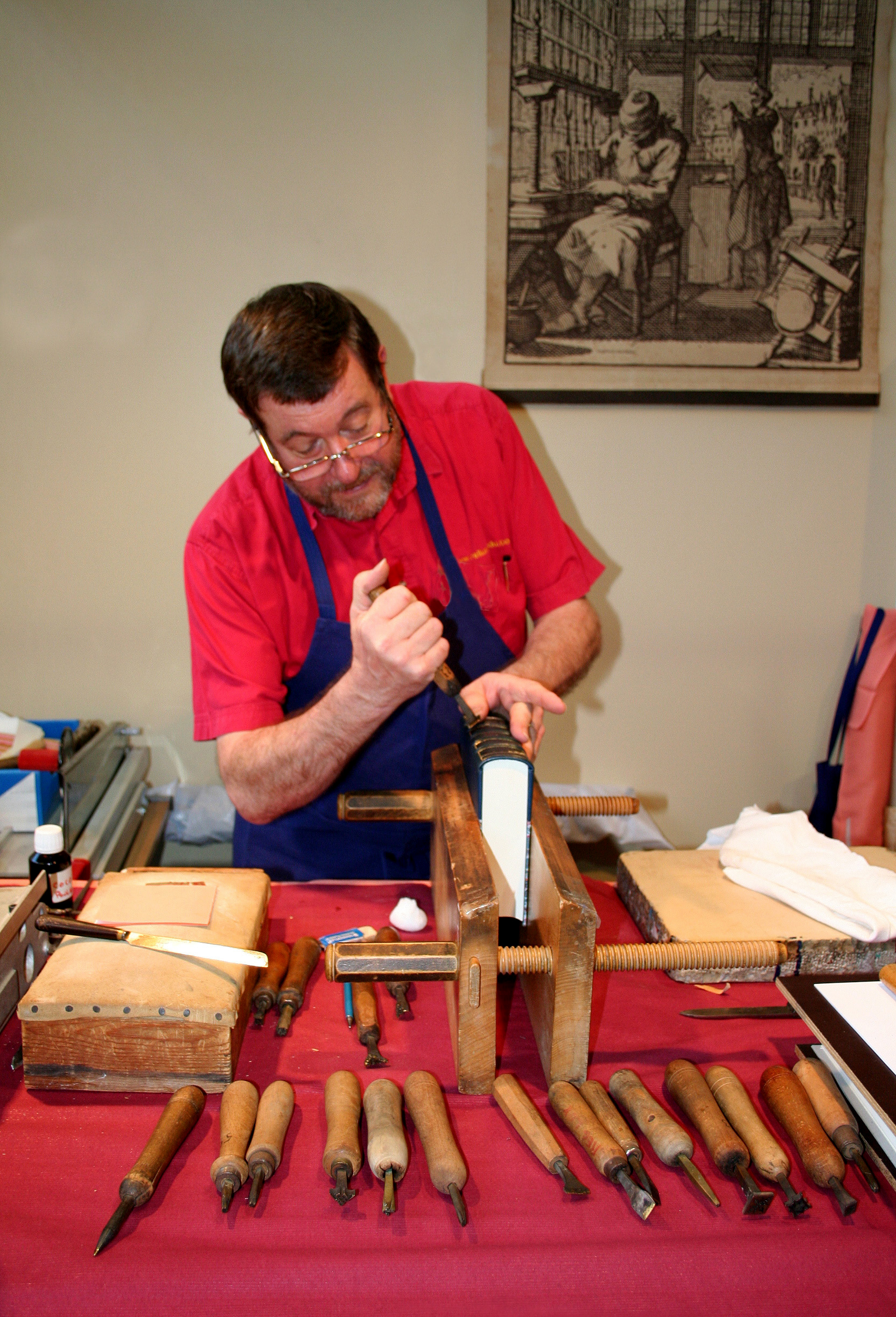
A traditional bookbinder at work

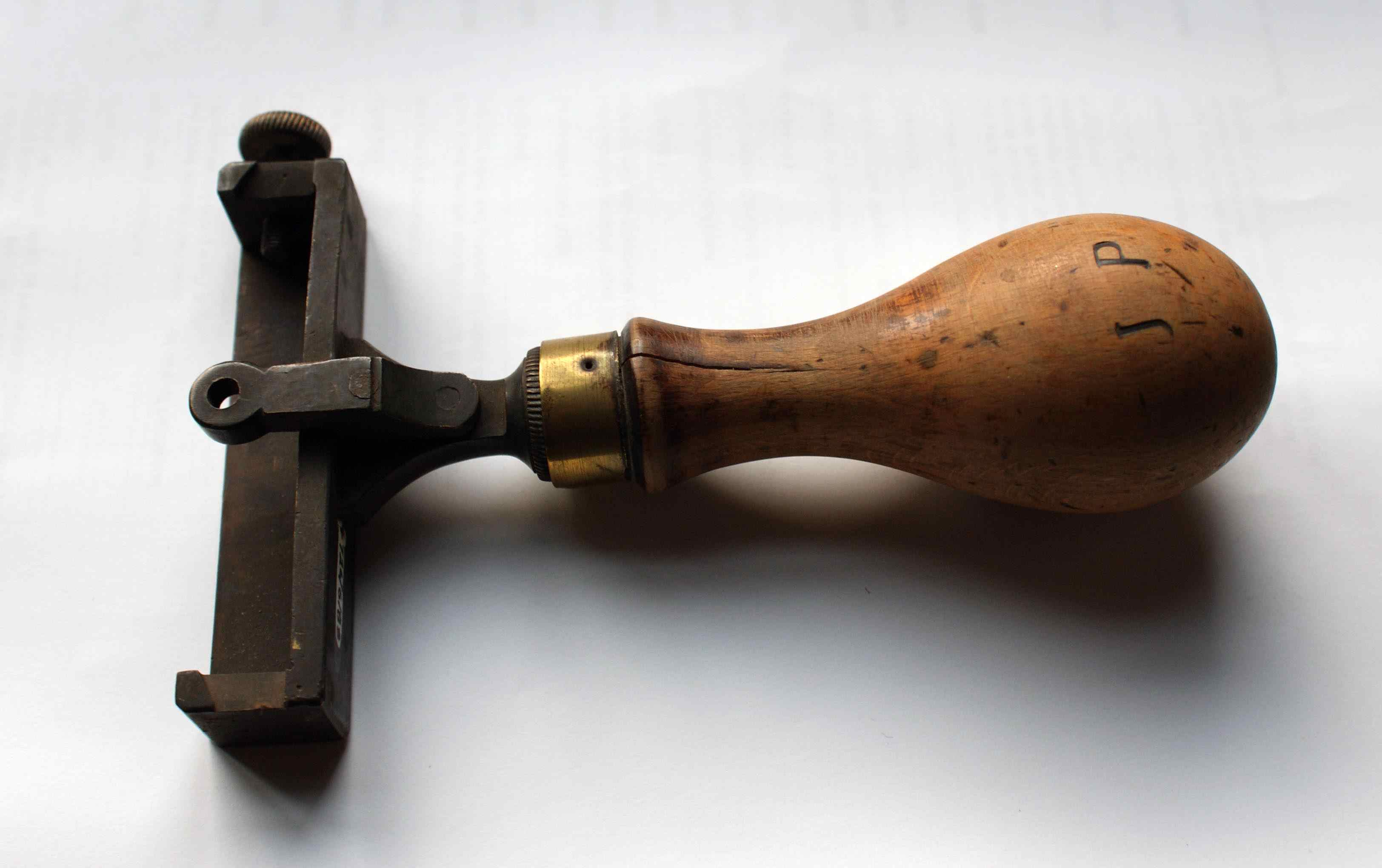
Bookbinder's type holder

Bookbinding is the process of building a book, usually in codex format, from an ordered stack of paper sheets with one's hands and tools, or in modern publishing, by a series of automated processes.

To bind a book, groups of pages are joined together, often by thread or adhesive but other options exist such as loose-leaf rings, binding posts, twin-loop spine coils, plastic spiral coils, and plastic spine combs. A cover to protect the contents, usually bearing publication information such as title and author, is generally attached; this can be as simple as a single sheet of paper or an elaborate construction of boards covered in cloth, leather, parchment, etc. with many types of decoration.

The process of making books varies significantly by time period and geography/culture. Mechanised bookbinding was introduced in the 19th century with the industrial revolution, alongside machine papermaking, faster methods of leather tanning, and other changes in manufacturing that affected the book.

The trade of bookbinding includes the binding of blank books and printed books. Blank books, or stationery bindings, are books planned to be written in. These include accounting ledgers, guestbooks, logbooks, notebooks, manifold books, day books, diaries, and sketchbooks. Printed books are produced through letterpress printing, offset lithography, or other printing techniques and their binding practices include fine binding, edition binding, publisher's bindings, and library binding.

== Overview ==
Bookbinding is a skilled trade that requires measuring, cutting, and gluing. A finished book requires many steps to complete. This is usually determined by the materials needed and the layout of the book. Bookbinding combines skills from the trades of papermaking, textile and leather-working crafts, model making, and graphic design. The trade of bookbinding can be a craft done out of creativity and passion or a factory-based process, but each type resolves three problems: how to bind the paper sheets into a book block; how to cover and protect the bound pages; and how to label and decorate the book covers that protect the pages.

== History ==
=== Origins of the book ===
Writers in the Hellenistic-Roman culture wrote longer texts as scrolls; these were stored in boxes or shelving with small cubbyholes, similar to a modern wine rack. Court records and notes were written on wax tablets, while important documents were written on papyrus or parchment. The modern English word "book" comes from the Proto-Germanic *bokiz, referring to the beechwood on which early written works were recorded.

The book was not needed in ancient times, as many early Greek texts—scrolls—were 30 pages long, which were customarily folded accordion-fashion to fit into the hand. Roman works were often longer, running to hundreds of pages. The Ancient Greek word for book was tome, meaning "to cut". The Egyptian Book of the Dead was a massive 200 pages long and was used in funerary services for the deceased. Torah scrolls, editions of first five books of the Old Testament, known as the Israelite (or Hebrew) Bible, were—and still are—also held in special holders when read.

Scrolls can be rolled in one of two ways. The first method is to wrap the scroll around a single core, similar to a modern roll of paper towels. While simple to construct, a single core scroll has a major disadvantage: in order to read text at the end of the scroll, the entire scroll must be unwound. This is partially overcome in the second method, which is to wrap the scroll around two cores, as in a Torah. With a double scroll, the text can be accessed from both beginning and end, and the portions of the scroll not being read can remain wound. This still leaves the scroll a sequential-access medium: to reach a given page, one generally has to unroll and re-roll many other pages.

=== Early book formats ===
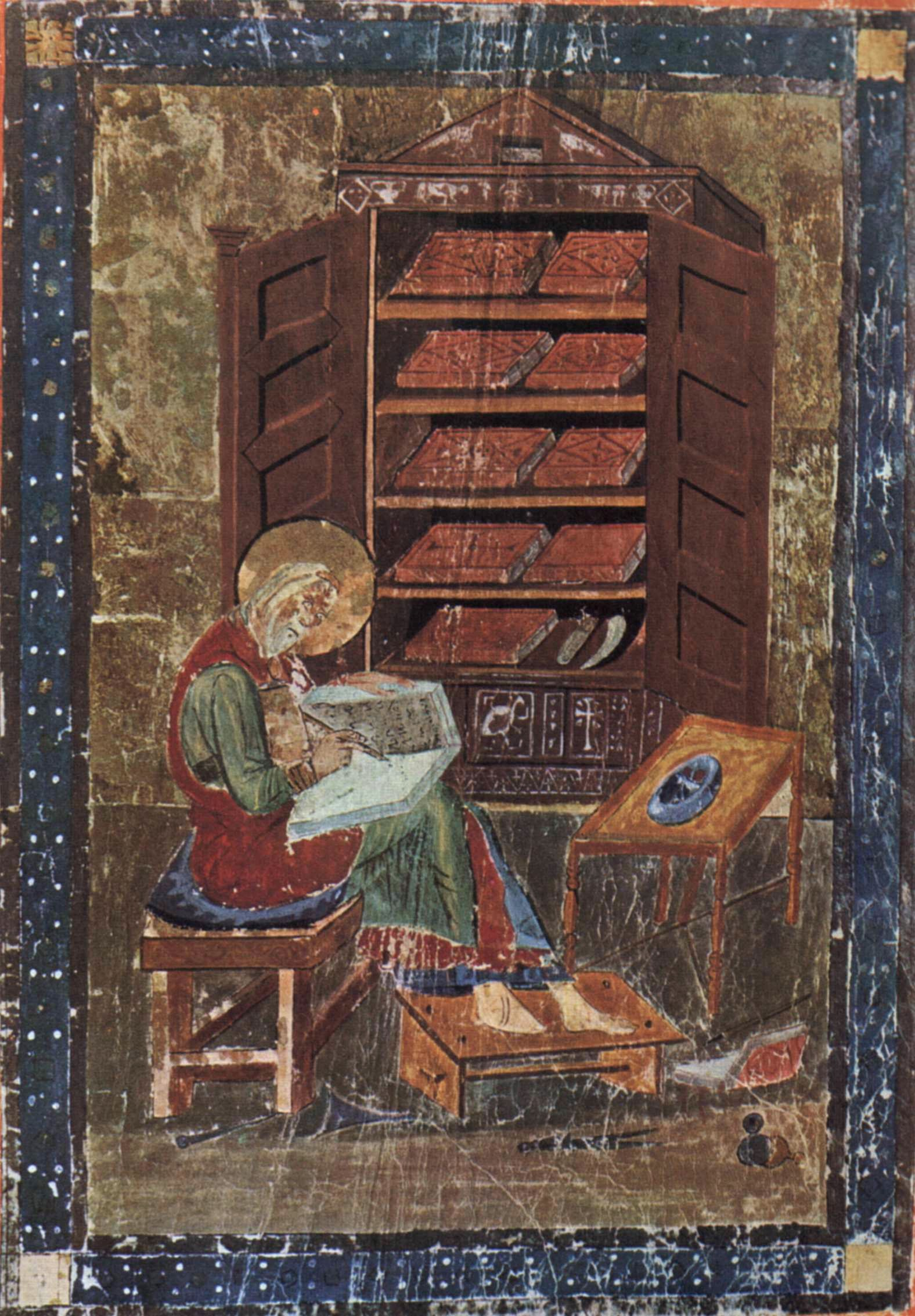
Early medieval bookcase containing about ten codices depicted in the Codex Amiatinus (c. 700)

In addition to the scroll, wax tablets were commonly used in Antiquity as a writing surface. Diptychs and later polyptych formats were often hinged together along one edge, analogous to the spine of modern books, as well as a folding concertina format. Such a set of simple wooden boards sewn together was called by the Romans a codex (pl. codices)—from the Latin word caudex, meaning "the trunk" of a tree, around the first century AD. Two ancient polyptychs, a pentaptych and octoptych, excavated at Herculaneum employed a unique connecting system that presages later sewing on thongs or cords.

At the turn of the first century, a kind of folded parchment notebook called pugillares membranei in Latin became commonly used for writing throughout the Roman Empire. This term was used by the Roman poet Martial. Martial used the term with reference to gifts of literature exchanged by Romans during the festival of Saturnalia. According to T. C. Skeat, "in at least three cases and probably in all, in the form of codices" and he theorized that this form of notebook was invented in Rome and then "must have spread rapidly to the Near East". In his discussion of one of the earliest pagan parchment codices to survive from Oxyrhynchus in Egypt, Eric Turner seems to challenge Skeat's notion when stating "its mere existence is evidence that this book form had a prehistory" and that "early experiments with this book form may well have taken place outside of Egypt".

Early intact codices were discovered at Nag Hammadi in Egypt. Consisting of primarily Gnostic texts in Coptic, the books were mostly written on papyrus, and while many are single-quire, a few are multi-quire. Codices were a significant improvement over papyrus or vellum scrolls in that they were easier to handle. However, despite allowing writing on both sides of the leaves, they were still foliated—numbered on the leaves, like the Indian books. The idea spread quickly through the early churches, and the word "Bible" comes from the town where the Byzantine monks established their first scriptorium, Byblos, in modern Lebanon. The idea of numbering each side of the page—Latin pagina, "to fasten"—appeared when the text of the individual testaments of the Bible were combined and text had to be searched through more quickly. This book format became the preferred way of preserving manuscript or printed material.

=== Development ===
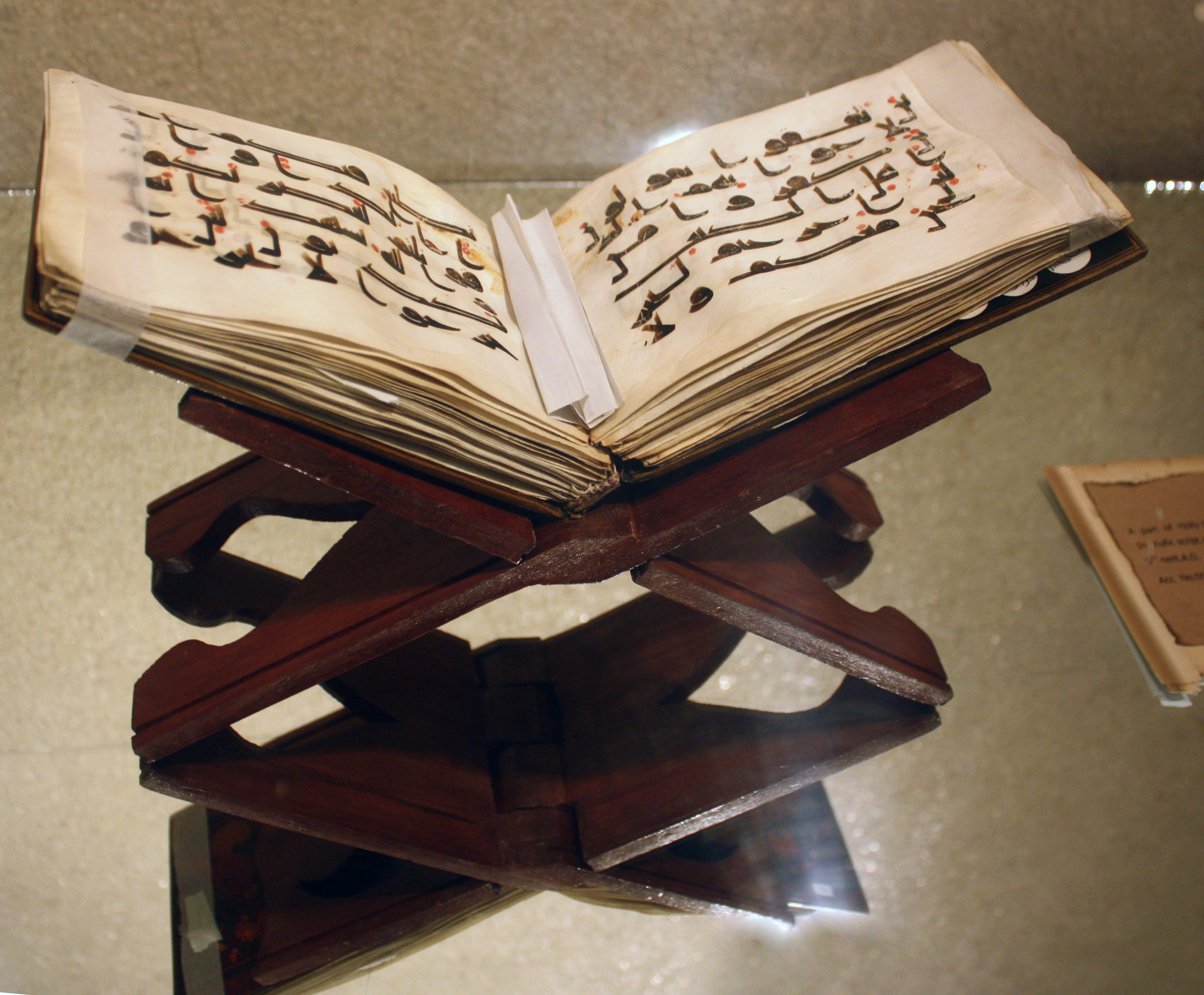
9th-century Qur'an in Reza Abbasi Museum

The codex-style book, using sheets of either papyrus or vellum (before the spread of Chinese papermaking outside of Imperial China), was invented in the Roman Empire during the 1st century AD. First described by the poet Martial from Roman Spain, it largely replaced earlier writing media such as wax tablets and scrolls by the year 300 AD. By the 6th century AD, the scroll and wax tablet had been completely replaced by the codex in the Western world. The world's earliest printed book is the Diamond Sutra, dating from 868 B.C.E.

Western books from the fifth century onwards were bound between hard covers, with pages made from parchment folded and sewn onto strong cords or ligaments that were attached to wooden boards and covered with leather. Since early books were exclusively handwritten on handmade materials, sizes and styles varied considerably, and there was no standard of uniformity. Early and medieval codices were bound with flat spines, and it was not until the fifteenth century that books began to have the rounded spines associated with hardcovers today. Because the vellum of early books would react to humidity by swelling, causing the book to take on a characteristic wedge shape, the wooden covers of medieval books were often secured with straps or clasps. These straps, along with metal bosses on the book's covers to keep it raised off the surface that it rests on, are collectively known as furniture.

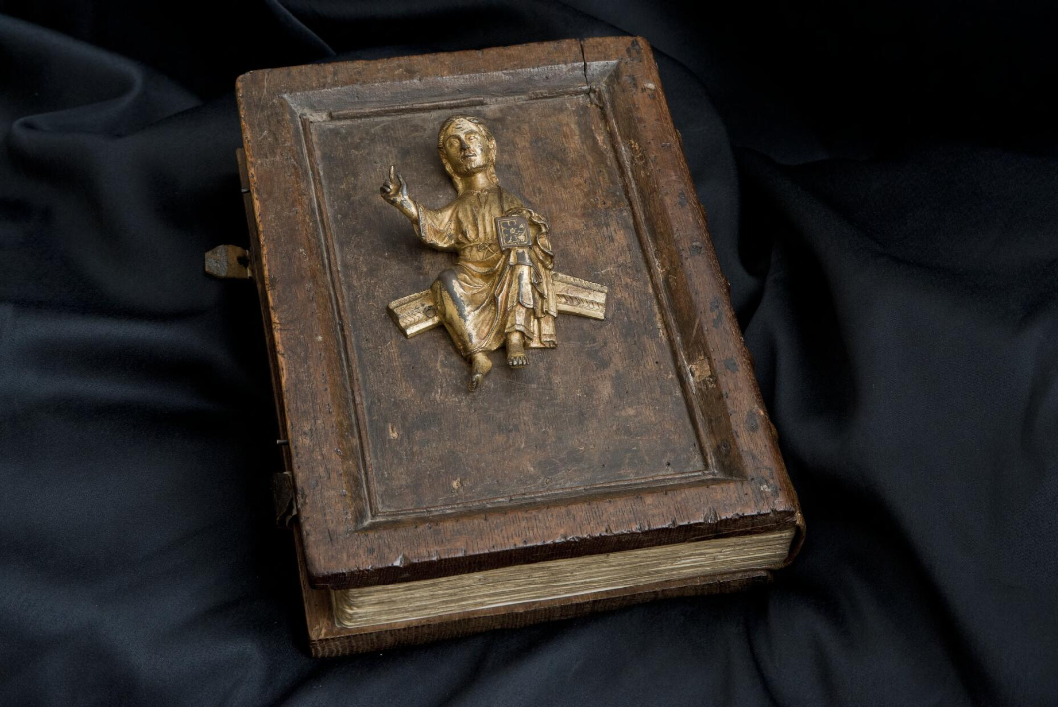
Decorative binding with figurehead of the 12th century manuscript Liber Landavensis

The earliest surviving European bookbinding is the St Cuthbert Gospel of about 700, in red goatskin, now in the British Library, whose decoration includes raised patterns and coloured tooled designs. Very grand manuscripts for liturgical rather than library use had covers in metalwork called treasure bindings, often studded with gems and incorporating ivory relief panels or enamel elements. Very few of these have survived intact, as they have been broken up for their precious materials, but a fair number of the ivory panels have survived, as they were hard to recycle; the divided panels from the Codex Aureus of Lorsch are among the most notable. The 8th century Vienna Coronation Gospels were given a new gold relief cover in about 1500, and the Lindau Gospels (now Morgan Library, New York) have their original cover from around 800.

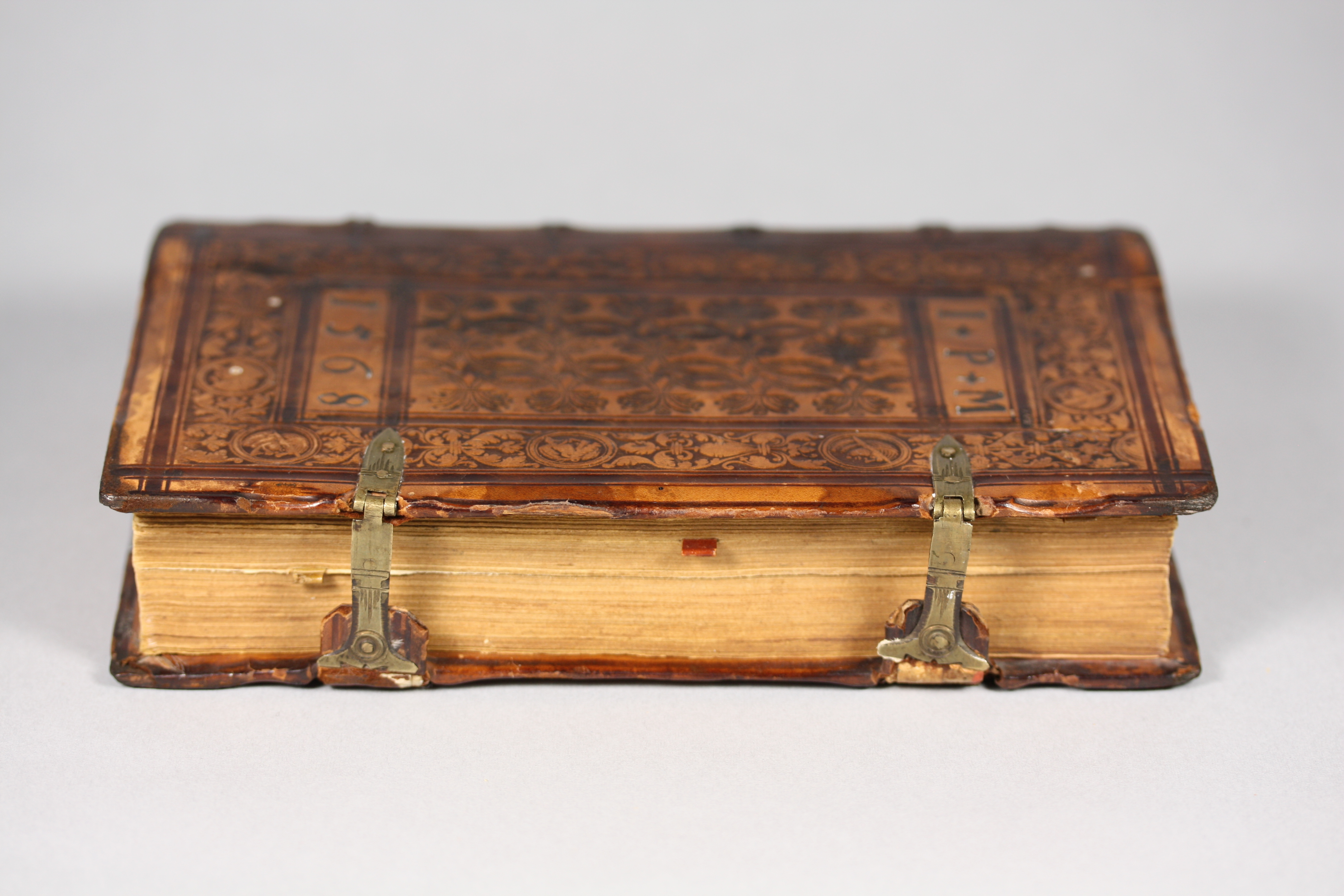
Sammelband of three alchemical treatises, bound in Strasbourg by Samuel Emmel c. 1568, showing metal clasps and leather covering of boards

Luxury medieval books for the library had leather covers decorated, often all over, with tooling (impressed decoration), and often small metal embellishments such as bosses and corners called furniture. Medieval tooling showed animals and figures as well as the vegetal and geometric designs that would later dominate book cover decoration. Until the end of the period books were not usually stood up on shelves in the modern way. The most functional books were bound in plain white vellum over boards, and had a brief title hand-written on the spine. Techniques for gold tooling were imported from the Islamic world in the 15th century, and thereafter the gold-tooled leather binding has remained the conventional choice for high quality bindings for collectors, though cheaper bindings that only used gold for the title on the spine, or not at all, were always more common. Although the arrival of the printed book vastly increased the number of books produced in Europe, it did not in itself change the various styles of binding used, except that vellum became much less used.

=== Introduction of paper ===
Although early, coarse hempen paper had existed in China during the Western Han period (202 BC – 9 AD), the Eastern-Han Chinese court eunuch Cai Lun (c. 50 – 121 AD) introduced the first significant improvement and standardization of papermaking by adding essential new materials into its composition.

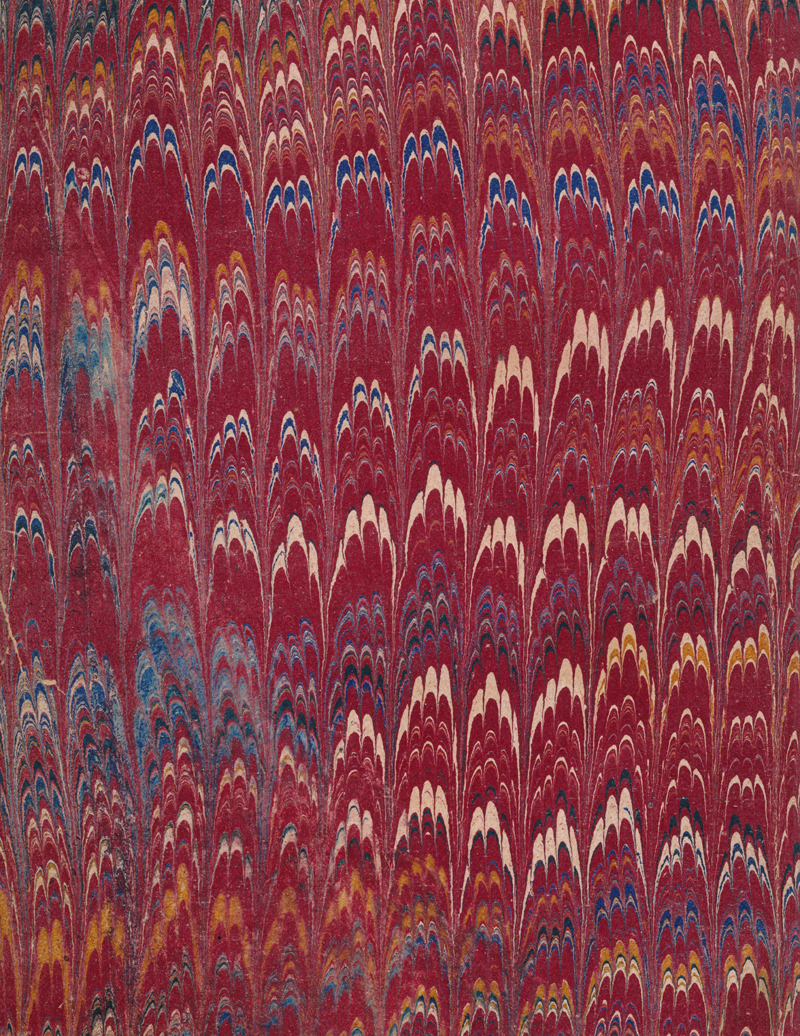
Marbled book board from a book published in London in 1872

Bookbinding in medieval China replaced traditional Chinese writing supports such as bamboo and wooden slips, as well as silk and paper scrolls. The evolution of the codex in China began with folded-leaf pamphlets in the 9th century AD, during the late Tang dynasty (618–907), improved by the 'butterfly' bindings of the Song dynasty (960–1279), the wrapped back binding of the Yuan dynasty (1271–1368), the stitched binding of the Ming (1368–1644) and Qing dynasties (1644–1912), and finally the adoption of Western-style bookbinding in the 20th century (coupled with the European printing press that replaced traditional Chinese printing methods). The initial phase of this evolution, the accordion-folded palm-leaf-style book, most likely came from India and was introduced to China via Buddhist missionaries and scriptures.

With the arrival (from the East) of rag paper manufacturing in Europe in the late Middle Ages and the use of the printing press beginning in the mid-15th century, bookbinding began to standardize somewhat, but page sizes still varied considerably.. Paper leaves also meant that heavy wooden boards and metal furniture were no longer necessary to keep books closed, allowing for much lighter pasteboard covers. The practice of rounding and backing the spines of books to create a solid, smooth surface and "shoulders" supporting the "text block" against its covers facilitated the upright storage of books and titling on spine. This became common practice by the close of the 16th century but was consistently practised in Rome as early as the 1520s.

In the early sixteenth century, the Italian printer Aldus Manutius realized that personal books would need to fit in saddle bags and thus produced books in the smaller formats of quartos (one-quarter-size pages) and octavos (one-eighth-size pages).

Leipzig, a prominent center of the German book-trade, in 1739 had 20 bookshops, 15 printing establishments, 22 book-binders and three type-foundries in a population of 28,000 people.

In the German book-distribution system of the late 18th and early 19th centuries, the end-user buyers of books "generally made separate arrangements with either the publisher or a bookbinder to have printed sheets bound according to their wishes and their budget".

The reduced cost of books facilitated cheap lightweight Bibles, made from tissue-thin oxford paper, with floppy covers, that resembled the early Arabic Qurans, enabling missionaries to take portable books with them around the world, and modern wood glues enabled the addition of paperback covers to simple glue bindings.

=== Forms of book binding ===
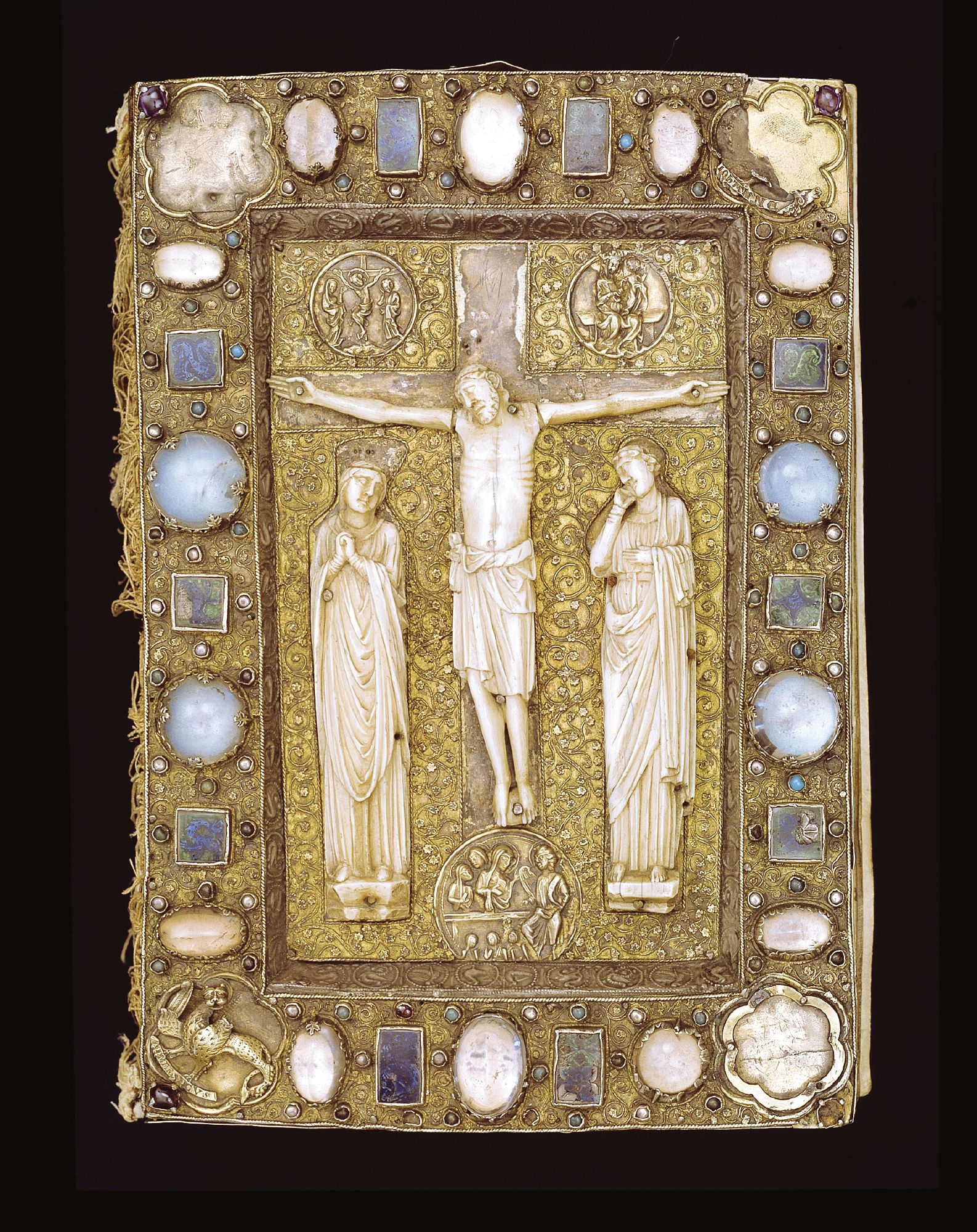
Gilt front cover adorned with walrus ivory on the Horne Book, Denmark, 13th century

The history of book-binding methods features:

- Coptic binding: a method of sewing leaves/pages together
- Ethiopian binding
- Long-stitch bookbinding
- Islamic bookcover features a flap on the back cover that encloses the front when the book is closed.
- Wooden-board binding
- Limp vellum binding
- Calf binding ("leather-bound")
- Paper case binding
- In-board cloth binding
- Cased cloth binding
- Embroidered binding
- Bradel binding
- Pothi
- Whirlwind Binding
- Accordion binding
- Butterfly Binding
- Wrapped Back Binding
- Side-stitched binding
- Metal Rod binding: Korea region
- Traditional Chinese bookbinding
- Girdle binding
- Anthropodermic bibliopegy (rare) bookbinding in human skin.
- Secret Belgian binding (or "crisscross binding"), invented in 1986.

== Modern commercial binding ==
Prior to the 20th century, most published books were sold with customized or temporary bindings, which varied greatly in dimension and overall construction. Today, most commercially produced books conform to one of four standardized categories:

=== Hardcover binding ===
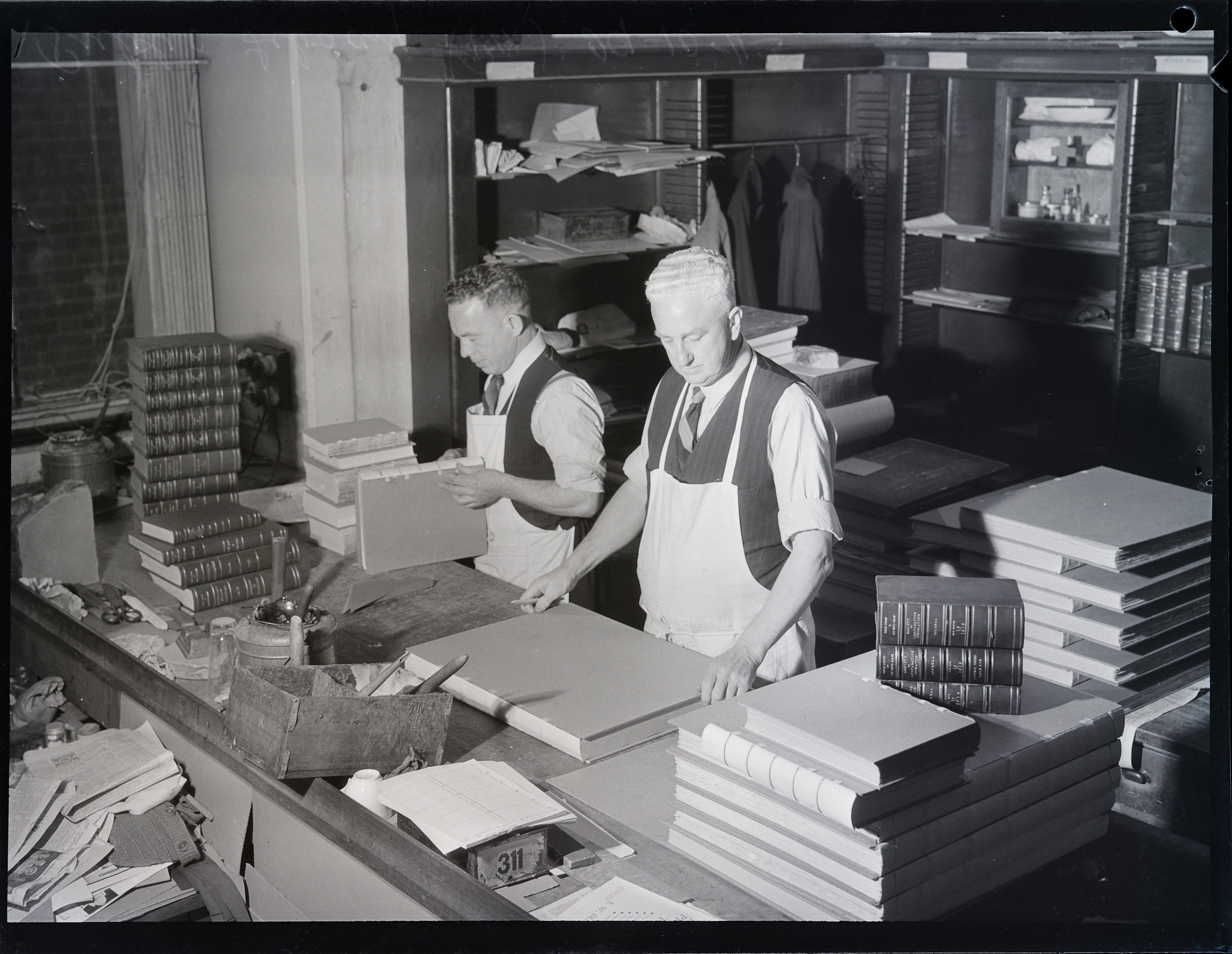
Book conservators at the State Library of New South Wales, 1943

A hardcover, hardbound or hardback book has rigid covers and is stitched in the spine. Looking from the top of the spine, the book can be seen to consist of a number of signatures bound together. When the book is opened in the middle of a signature, the binding threads are visible. Signatures of hardcover books are typically octavo (a single sheet folded three times), though they may also be folio, quarto, or 16mo (see Book size). Unusually large and heavy books are sometimes bound with wire.

Archibald Leighton is generally credited with having introduced cotton-based book cloth to wholesale bookbinding, which was of great importance to the economy and global expansion of book sales in the 19th century. The new material was much longer lasting than paper "boards" and significantly cheaper than the more elegant leather bindings. As the century progressed, fine quality mass produced covers emerged, often with bright colours and textures, introduced by Archibald Winterbottom & Sons, which dominated bookbinding for a century.

Until the mid-20th century, covers of mass-produced books were laid with bookcloth, but from that period onward, most publishers adopted clothette, a kind of textured paper which vaguely resembles cloth but is easily differentiated on close inspection. Most cloth-bound books are now half-and-half covers with cloth covering only the spine. In that case, the cover has a paper overlap. The covers of modern hardback books are made of thick cardboard.

Some books that appeared in the mid-20th century signature-bound appear in reprinted editions in glued-together editions. Copies of such books stitched together in their original format are often difficult to find and are much sought after for both aesthetic and practical reasons.

A variation of the hardcover which is more durable is the calf-binding, where the cover is either half or fully clad in leather, usually from a calf. This is also called full-bound or, simply, leather bound.

Library binding refers to the hardcover binding of books intended for the rigors of library use and are largely serials and paperback publications. Though many publishers have started to provide "library binding" editions, many libraries elect to purchase paperbacks and have them rebound in hard covers for longer life.

==== Methods ====
There are a number of methods used to bind hardcover books. Those still in use include:

1. Case binding is the most common type of hardcover binding for books. The pages are arranged in signatures and glued together into a "text block". The text block is then attached to the cover or "case" which is made of cardboard covered with paper, cloth, vinyl or leather. This is also known as cloth binding, or edition binding.
2. Oversewing, where the signatures of the book start off as loose pages which are then clamped together. Small vertical holes are punched through the far left-hand edge of each signature, and then the signatures are sewn together with lockstitches to form the text block. Oversewing is a very strong method of binding and can be done on books up to five inches thick. However, the margins of oversewn books are reduced, and the pages will not lie flat when opened.
3. Sewing through the fold (also called Smyth sewing), where the signatures of the book are folded and stitched through the fold, has been called the "gold standard" for binding. The signatures are then sewn and glued together at the spine to form a text block. In contrast to oversewing, through-the-fold books have wide margins and can open completely flat. Pages cannot fall out unless they are ripped. Many varieties of sewing stitches exist, from basic links to the often-used kettle stitch. While Western books are generally sewn through punched holes or sawed notches along the fold, some Asian bindings, such as the retchoso or butterfly stitch of Japan, use small slits instead of punched holes.
4. Double-fan adhesive binding starts off with a stack of loose pages, which is run over a roller, "fanning" the pages, to apply a thin layer of glue to each page edge. Then the pages are perfectly aligned to form a text block, and the glued edges of the text block are attached to a piece of cloth lining to form the spine. Double-fan adhesive bound books can open completely flat and have a wide margin. However, certain types of paper do not hold adhesive well, and, with wear and tear, the pages can come loose.

=== Punch and bind ===
Different types of the punch and bind binding include:

1. Double wire, twin loop, or Wire-O binding is a type of binding that is used for books that will be viewed or read in an office or home type environment. The binding involves the use of a C-shaped wire spine that is squeezed into a round shape using a wire closing device. Double wire binding allows books to have smooth crossover and is affordable in many colours. This binding is great for annual reports, owners' manuals and software manuals. Wire bound books are made of individual sheets, each punched with a line of round or square holes on the binding edge.
  This type of binding uses either a 3:1 pitch hole pattern with three holes per inch or a 2:1 pitch hole pattern with two holes per inch. The three to one hole pattern is used for smaller books that are up to 9/16" in diameter while the 2:1 pattern is normally used for thicker books as the holes are slightly bigger to accommodate slightly thicker, stronger wire. Once punched, the back cover is then placed on to the front cover ready for the wire binding elements (double loop wire) to be inserted. The wire is then placed through the holes. The next step involves the binder holding the book by its pages and inserting the wire into a "closer" which is basically a vise that crimps the wire closed and into its round shape. The back page can then be turned back to its correct position, thus hiding the spine of the book.
2. Comb binding uses a 9/16" pitch rectangular hole pattern punched near the bound edge. A curled plastic "comb" is fed through the slits to hold the sheets together. Comb binding allows a book to be disassembled and reassembled by hand without damage. Comb supplies are typically available in a wide range of colours and diameters. The supplies themselves can be re-used or recycled. In the United States, comb binding is often referred to as 19-ring binding because it uses a total of 19 holes along the 11-inch side of a sheet of paper.
3. VeloBind is used to permanently rivet pages together using a plastic strip on the front and back of the document. Sheets for the document are punched with a line of holes near the bound edge. A series of pins attached to a plastic strip called a Comb feeds through the holes to the other side and then goes through another plastic strip called the receiving strip. The excess portion of the pins is cut off and the plastic heat-sealed to create a relatively flat bind method. VeloBind provides a more permanent bind than comb-binding but is primarily used for business and legal presentations and small publications.
4. Spiral binding is the most economical form of mechanical binding when using plastic or metal. It is commonly used for atlases and other publications where it is necessary or desirable for the publication to be opened back onto itself without breaking or damaging the spine. A number of different varieties exist, though all are produced through the basic principle of a wire helix being wound through a number of holes punched along the spine of the book, providing a hinge with a greater degree of flexibility.
  Spiral coil binding uses a number of different hole patterns for binding documents. The most common hole pattern used is 4:1 pitch (4 holes per inch). However, spiral coil spines are also available for use with 3:1 pitch, 5:1 pitch and 0.400-hole patterns.

=== Thermally activated binding ===
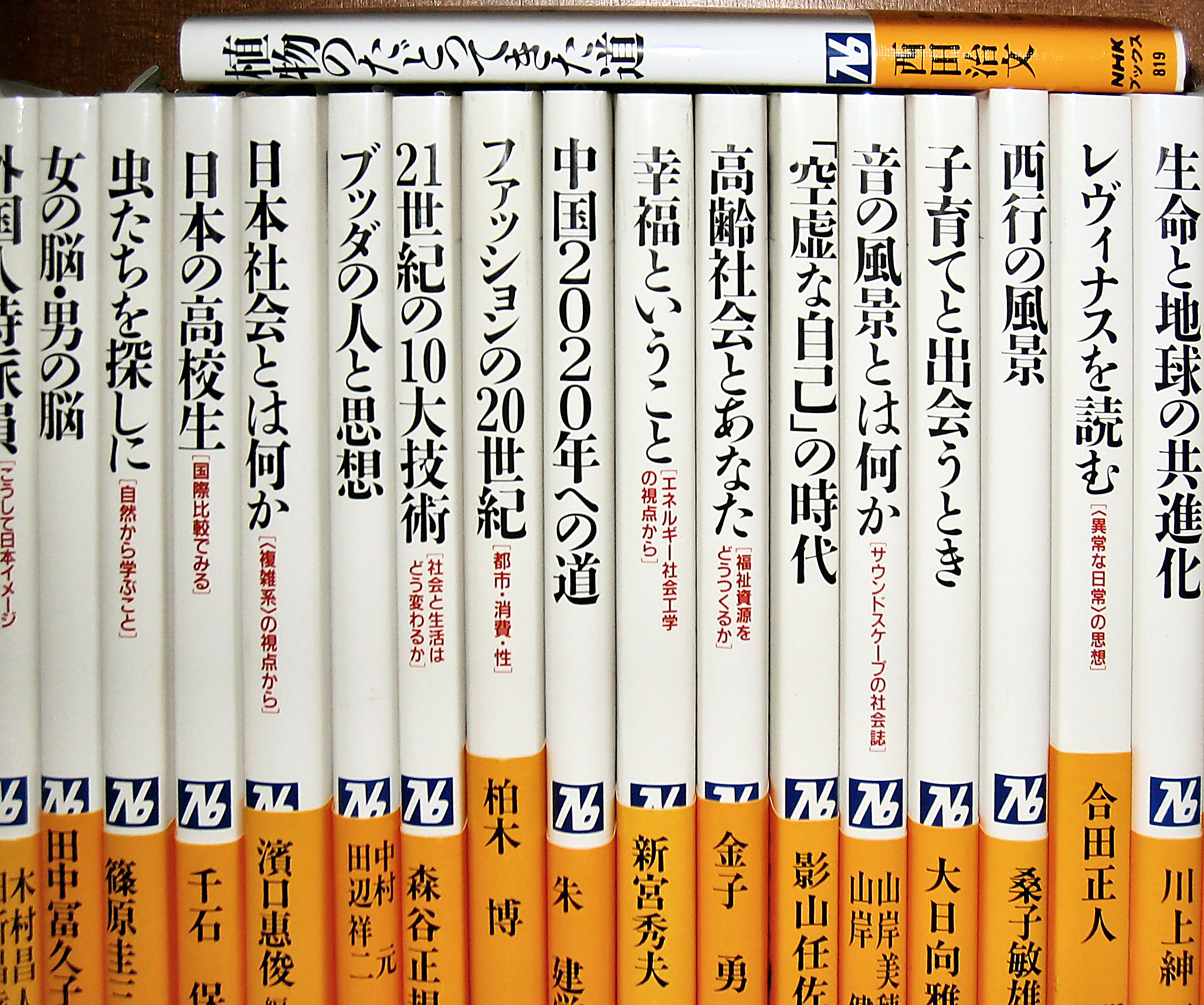
Modern paperback spines

Some of the different types of thermally activated binding include:

1. Perfect binding is often used for paperback books. It is also used for magazines; National Geographic is one example of this type. Perfect bound books usually consist of various sections with a cover made from heavier paper, glued together at the spine with a strong glue. The sections are milled in the back and notches are applied into the spine to allow hot glue to penetrate into the spine of the book. The other three sides are then face trimmed, allowing the magazine or paperback book to be opened. Mass-market paperbacks (pulp paperbacks) are small (16mo size), cheaply made with each sheet fully cut and glued at the spine; these are likely to fall apart or lose sheets after much handling or several years. Trade paperbacks are more sturdily made, with traditional gatherings or sections of bifolios, usually larger, and more expensive. The difference between the two can usually easily be seen by looking for the sections in the top or bottom sides of the book.
2. Thermal binding uses a one-piece cover with glue applied to its spine to quickly and easily bind documents without the need for punching. Individuals usually purchase "thermal covers" or "therm-a-bind covers", which are usually made to fit a standard-size sheet of paper and come with a glue channel down the spine. The paper is placed in the cover, heated in a machine (resembling a griddle), and when the glue cools, it adheres the paper to the spine. Thermal glue strips can also be purchased separately for individuals that wish to use customized or original covers. However, creating documents using thermal binding glue strips can be a tedious process, requiring a scoring device and a large-format printer.
3. A cardboard article is a publication that resembles a hardbound book, despite being a paperback with a hard cover. Many books sold as hardcover are actually of this type; the Modern Library series is an example. This type of document is usually bound with thermal adhesive glue using a perfect-binding machine.
4. Tape binding refers to a binding method that utilizes thermal adhesive tape applied to the base of a document. A tape binding machine, such as the PLANAX COPY Binder or Powis Parker Fastback system, is then typically used to complete the binding process and to activate the thermal adhesive on the glue strip. However, some users also refer to tape binding as the process of adding a coloured tape to the edge of a mechanically fastened (stapled or stitched) document.

=== Stitched or sewn binding ===
1. A sewn book is constructed in the same way as a hardbound book, except that it lacks the hard covers. The binding is as durable as that of a hardbound book.
2. Stapling through the centerfold, also called saddle-stitching, joins a set of nested folios into a single magazine issue; most comic books are well-known examples of this type.
3. Magazines are considered more ephemeral than books, and less durable means of binding them are usual. In general, the cover papers of magazines will be the same as the inner pages (self-cover) or only slightly heavier (plus cover). Most magazines are stapled or saddle-stitched; however, some are bound with perfect binding and use thermally activated adhesive.

== Modern hand binding ==
Scheme of common book design: 1. Belly band; 2. Flap; 3. Endpaper; 4. Book cover; 5. Head; 6. Fore edge; 7. Tail; 8. Right page, recto; 9. Left page, verso; 10. Gutter

Modern bookbinding by hand can be seen as two closely allied fields: the creation of new bindings, and the repair of existing bindings. Bookbinders are often active in both fields. Bookbinders can learn the craft through apprenticeship; by attending specialized trade schools; by taking classes in the course of university studies, or by a combination of those methods. Some European countries offer a Master Bookbinder certification, though no such certification exists in the United States. MFA programs that specialize in the 'Book Arts' (hand papermaking, printmaking and bookbinding) are available through certain colleges and universities.

Hand bookbinders create new bindings that run the gamut from historical book structures made with traditional materials to modern structures made with 21st-century materials, and from basic cloth-case bindings to valuable full-leather fine bindings. Repairs to existing books also encompass a broad range of techniques, from minimally invasive conservation of a historic book to the full restoration and rebinding of a text.

Though almost any existing book can be repaired to some extent, only books that were originally sewn can be rebound by resewing. Repairs or restorations are often done to emulate the style of the original binding. For new works, some publishers print unbound manuscripts which a binder can collate and bind, but often an existing commercially bound book is pulled, or taken apart, in order to be given a new binding. Once the text block of the book has been pulled, it can be rebound in almost any structure; a modern suspense novel, for instance, could be rebound to look like a 16th-century manuscript. Bookbinders may bind several copies of the same text, giving each copy a unique appearance.

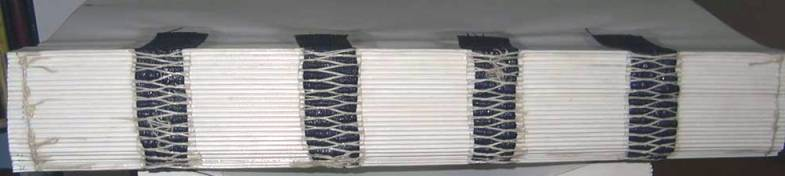
Hardbound book spine stitching

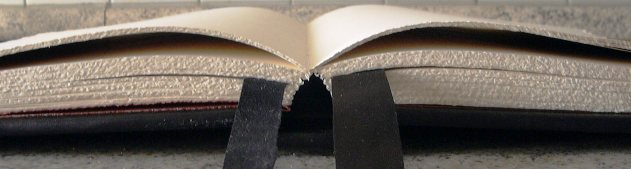
Traditionally sewn book opened flat

Hand bookbinders use a variety of specialized hand tools, the most emblematic of which is the bone folder, a flat, tapered, polished piece of bone used to crease paper and apply pressure. Additional tools common to hand bookbinding include a variety of knives and hammers, as well as brass tools used for gold and blind tooling during the finishing process (as seen in the lead photograph for this article).

When creating new work, modern hand binders often work on commission, creating bindings for specific books or collections. Books can be bound in many different materials. Some of the more common materials for covers are leather, decorative paper, and cloth (see also: buckram). Those bindings that are made with exceptionally high craftsmanship, and that are made of particularly high-quality materials (especially full leather bindings), are known as fine or extra bindings. Also, when creating a new work, modern binders may wish to select a book that has already been printed and create what is known as a 'design binding'. "In a typical design binding, the binder selects an already printed book, disassembles it, and rebinds it in a style of fine binding—rounded and backed spine, laced-in boards, sewn headbands, decorative end sheets, leather cover etc."

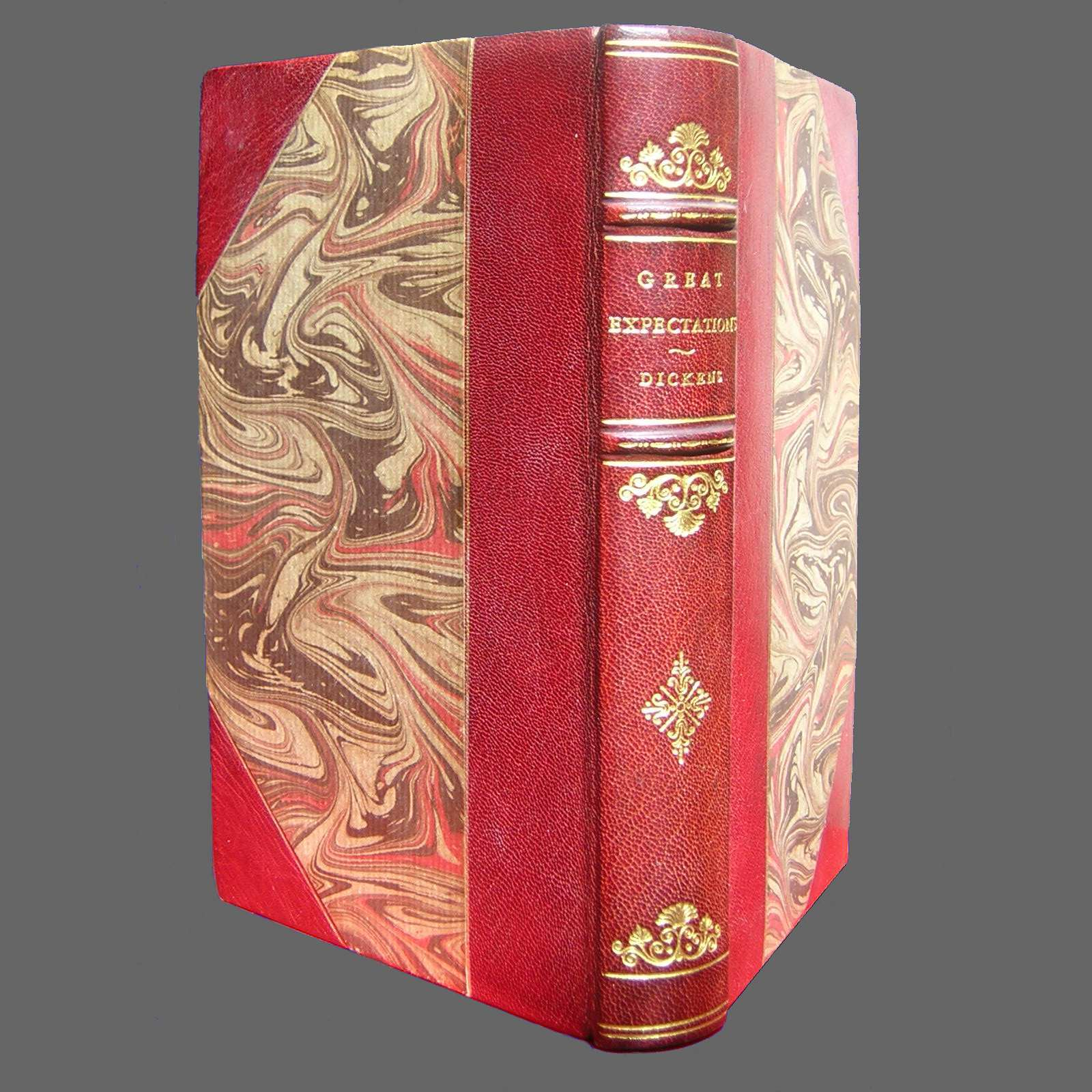
Hardbound book with half leather binding (spine and corners) and marbled boards

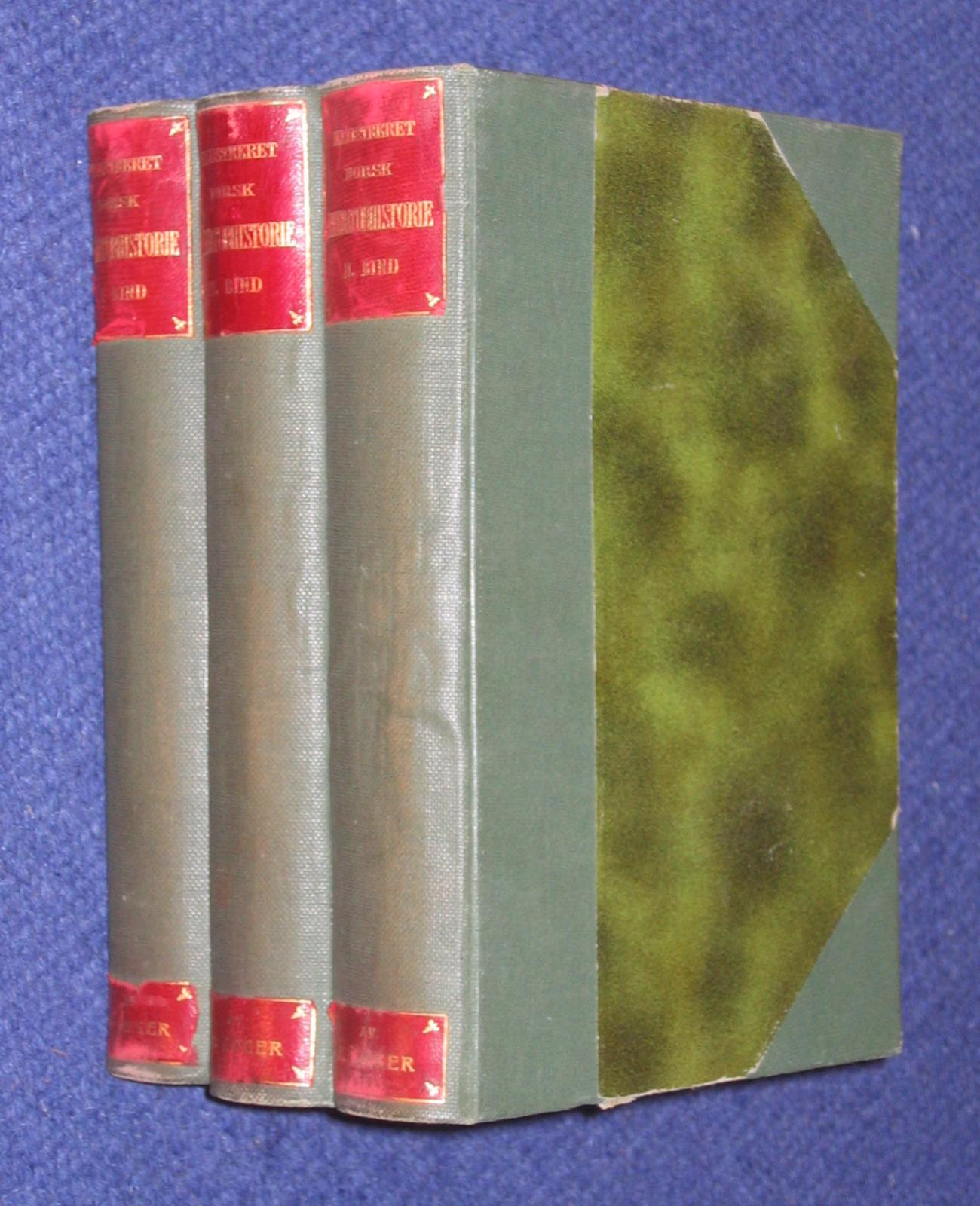
Cloth book cover with attached paper panel, mimicking half leather binding

== Conservation and restoration ==
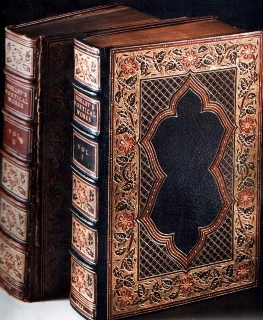
Rebacking saving original spine, showing one volume finished and one untouched

Conservation and restoration are practices intended to repair damage to an existing book. While they share methods, their goals differ. The goal of conservation is to slow the book's decay and restore it to a usable state while altering its physical properties as little as possible. Conservation methods have been developed in the course of taking care of large collections of books. The term archival comes from taking care of the institution's archive of books. The goal of restoration is to return the book to a previous state as envisioned by the restorer, often imagined as the original state of the book. The methods of restoration have been developed by bookbinders with private clients mostly interested in improving their collections.

In either case, one of the modern standards for conservation and restoration is "reversibility". That is, any repair should be done in such a way that it can be undone if and when a better technique is developed in the future. Bookbinders echo the physician's creed, "First, do no harm". While reversibility is one standard, longevity of the functioning of the book is also very important and sometimes takes precedence over reversibility especially in areas that are invisible to the reader such as the spine lining.

Books requiring restoration or conservation treatment run the gamut from the very earliest of texts to books with modern bindings that have undergone heavy usage. For each book, a course of treatment must be chosen that takes into account the book's value, whether it comes from the binding, the text, the provenance, or some combination of the three. Many people choose to rebind books, from amateurs who restore old paperbacks on internet instructions to many professional book and paper conservators and restorers, who often in the United States are members of the American Institute for Conservation of Historic and Artistic Works (AIC).

Often the books that need to be restored are hundreds of years old, meaning the pages and binding must be handled with great care. Restoration and conservation can extend a book's life by decades, which is essential for preserving rare texts with only a few copies left worldwide.

Typically, the first step in saving and preserving a book is its deconstruction. The text pages need to be separated from the covers and, if necessary, the stitching removed. This is done as delicately as possible. All page restoration is done at this point, be it the removal of foxing, ink stains, page tears, etc. Various techniques are employed to repair the various types of page damage that might have occurred during the life of the book.

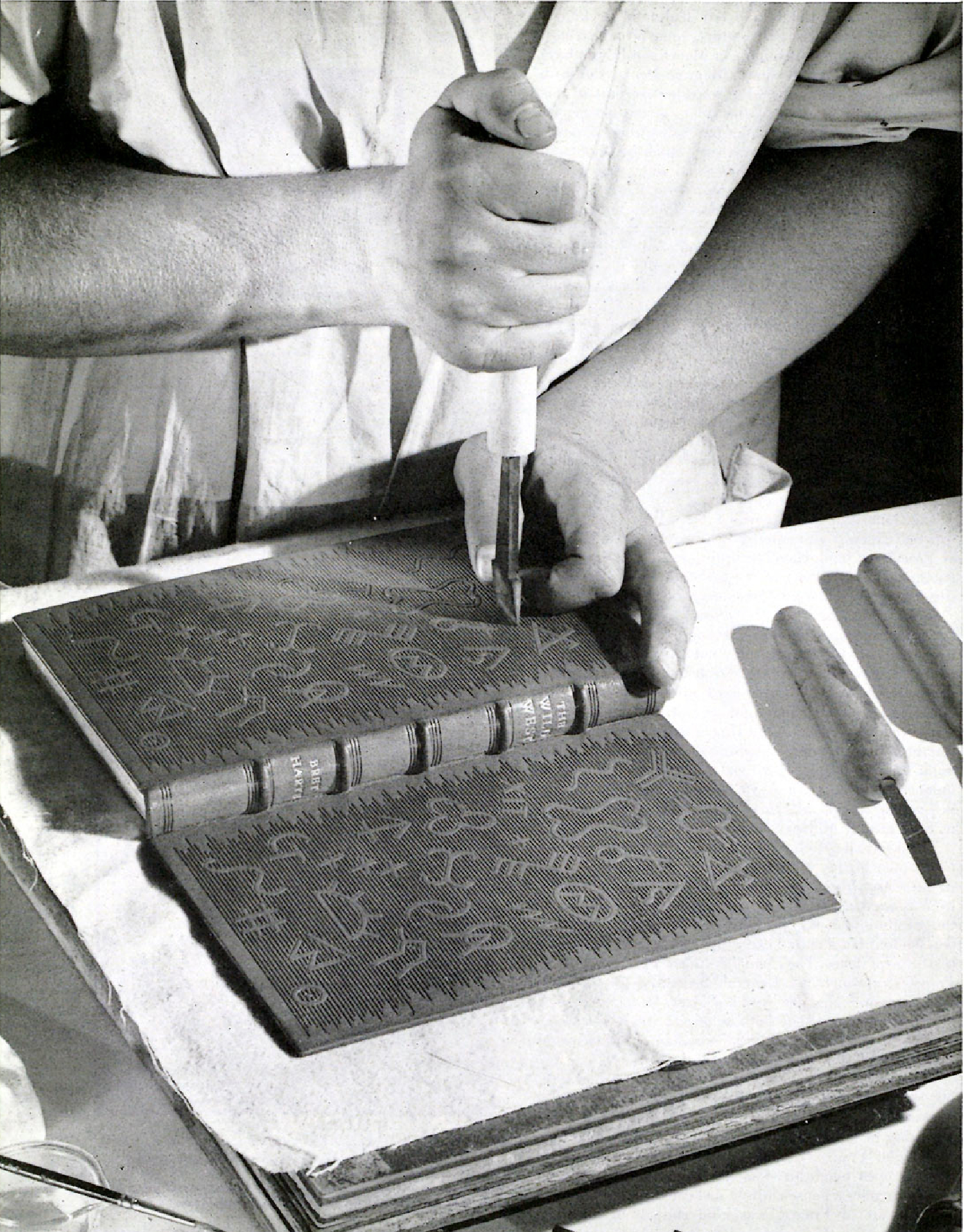
Detailed blind tooling of a book binding

The preparation of the "foundations" of the book could mean the difference between a work of art and a useless stack of paper and leather.

The sections are then hand-sewn in the style of its period, back into book form, or the original sewing is strengthened with new lining on the text-spine. New hinges must be accounted for in either case both with text-spine lining and some sort of end-sheet restoration.

The next step is the restoration of the book cover. This can be as complicated as completely re-creating a period binding to match the original using whatever is appropriate for that time it was originally created. Sometimes this means a new full leather binding with vegetable tanned leather, dyed with natural dyes, and hand-marbled papers may be used for the sides or end-sheets. Finally, the cover is hand-tooled in gold leaf. The design of the book cover involves such hand-tooling, where an extremely thin layer of gold is applied to the cover. Such designs can be lettering, symbols, or floral designs, depending on the nature of any particular project.

Sometimes the restoration of the cover is a matter of surgically strengthening the original cover by lifting the original materials and applying new materials for strength. This is perhaps a more common method for covers made with book-cloth although leather books can be approached this way as well. Materials such as Japanese tissues of various weights may be used. Colors may be matched using acrylic paints or simple coloured pencils.

It is usually harder to restore leather books because of the fragility of the materials.

== Terms and techniques ==
- In a finished book, a leaf (folio) has two pages of text or images, front and back, therefore, "on the folium" usually is followed by an alphanumeric designation that distinguishes recto from verso, thus "folio 5r" means "On the recto of the leaf numbered 5":
  - The recto side of a leaf faces left when the leaf is held upright from the spine (usually an odd-numbered page in a book).
  - The verso side of a leaf faces right when the leaf is held upright from the spine (usually an even-numbered page in a book).
- A bifolium is a single sheet of paper folded in half to make two leaves; the plural is "bifolia".
- A section (also a gathering, and quire if unprinted) is a group of bifolia folded together. In a finished book, each section is sewn through the fold. The number of bifolia determine the name of the section:
  - duernion — two bifolia, producing four leaves;
  - ternion — three bifolia, producing six leaves;
  - quaternion — four bifolia, producing eight leaves;
  - quinternion — five bifolia, producing ten leaves;
  - sexternion (also sextern) — six bifolia, producing twelve leaves.
- A signature is a section labelled with a signature mark, usually, either a letter or a number printed on the first leaf of a section to facilitate collation.
- A text block (also text-block, textblock, book block, and body of the book — although not to be confused with the concept of body text nor body matter nor text-block (typography)) is a collection of sections or leaves bound together, which can be attached to a case (book cover) to form a book. The term bookblock includes the textblock as well as endleaves and interleaving.
- A codex is a series of quires sewn and bound through the folds.
- Folio and quarto refer to the size of the finished book, based on the size of the sheet of handmade paper (which varies but is limited by the size of the papermaking mould and the printing press), and the number of times that sheet is folded after printing:
  - A folio volume is typically 15 in (38 cm) or more in height, the largest book of regular dimensions.
  - A quarto volume (eight-page signature) is typically 9 by 12 in (23 by 30 cm), about the size of a modern magazine. A sheet folded in quarto (also 4to. and 4º) is twice folded in half at right angles to make four leaves.
  - An octavo (8vo) volume (sixteen-page signature) is typically 5 to 6 in (13 to 15 cm) by 8 to 9 in (20 to 23 cm), the size of a digest magazine and a trade paperback book. A sheet folded in octavo (also 8vo. and 8º) is folded in half three times to make 8 leaves.
  - A sextodecimo volume (thirty-two-page signature) is typically 4 1/2 by 6 3/4 in (11 by 17 cm), the dimensions of a mass-market paperback book. A sheet of paper folded in sextodecimo (also 16mo. and 16º) is folded in half four times to make 16 leaves.
  - Duodecimo (12mo), 24mo, 32mo, and 64mo are page sizes that allow printing between 24 and 128 pages on a single sheet of paper.
- Trimming separates the leaves of the bound book into pages. A sheet folded in quarto will have folds at the spine and at the top, which must be trimmed before the leaves can be turned. A quire folded in octavo might require trimming of the other two edges. Moreover, books with a Deckle edge (uncut) are untrimmed and usually are special interest objets d'art to and for book collectors.

=== Paperback binding ===
Regardless of whether a book is bound with a hardcover or bound with a paperback cover, the binding of the signatures determines the durability of the book-as-artefact. In the case of perfect binding, the pages are aligned, cut, and glued with a strong and flexible layer that holds the book together. In a paperback book, the visible portion of the spine is part of the flexible layer.

== Spine ==
=== Orientation ===
- In languages written from left to right, such as English, books are bound on the left side of the cover; looking from on top, the pages increase counterclockwise. In right-to-left languages, books are bound on the right. In both cases, this is so the end of a page coincides with where it is turned. Many translations of Japanese comic books retain the binding on the right, which allows the art, laid out to be read right-to-left, to be published without mirror-imaging it.

In China (only areas using Traditional Chinese), Japan, and Taiwan, literary books are written top-to-bottom, right-to-left, and thus are bound on the right, while textbooks are written left-to-right, top-to-bottom, and thus are bound on the left. In mainland China the direction of writing and binding for all books was changed to be like left to right languages in the mid-20th century.

=== Titling ===
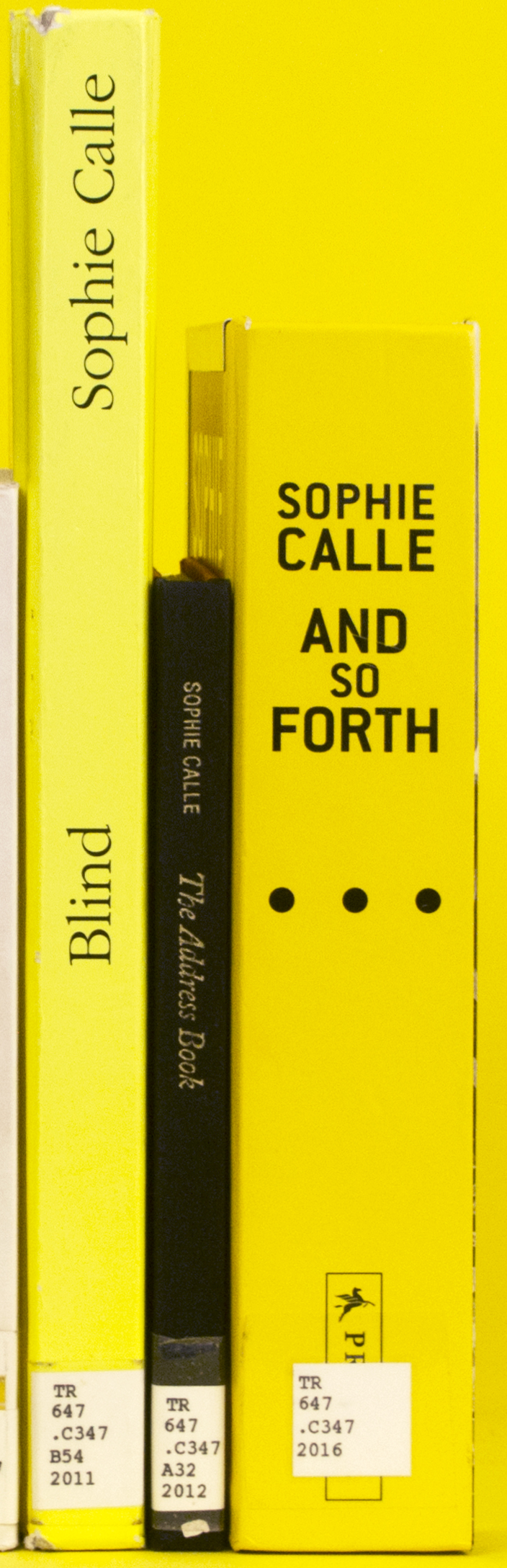
Three books with different titling orientations: ascending (left); descending (middle); upright (right)

Early books did not have titles on their spines; rather they were shelved flat with their spines inward, and titles written with ink along their fore edges. Modern books display their titles on their spines.

In languages with Chinese-influenced writing systems, the title is written top-to-bottom, as is the language in general. In languages written from left to right, the spine text can be pillar (one letter per line), transverse (text line perpendicular to long edge of spine) and along spine. Conventions differ about the direction in which the title along the spine is rotated:

- Top-to-bottom (descending):

In texts published or printed in the United States, the United Kingdom, the Commonwealth, Scandinavia and the Netherlands, the spine text, when the book is standing upright, runs from the top to the bottom. This means that when the book is lying flat with the front cover upwards, the title is oriented left-to-right on the spine. This practice is reflected in the industry standards ANSI/NISO Z39.41 and ISO 6357, but "lack of agreement in the matter persisted among English-speaking countries as late as the middle of the twentieth century, when books bound in Britain still tended to have their titles read up the spine".

- Bottom-to-top (ascending):

In most of continental Europe, Latin America, and French Canada the spine text, when the book is standing upright, runs from the bottom up, so the title can be read by tilting the head to the left. This allows the reader to read spines of books shelved in alphabetical order in accordance to the usual way: left-to-right and top-to-bottom.

=== Design ===
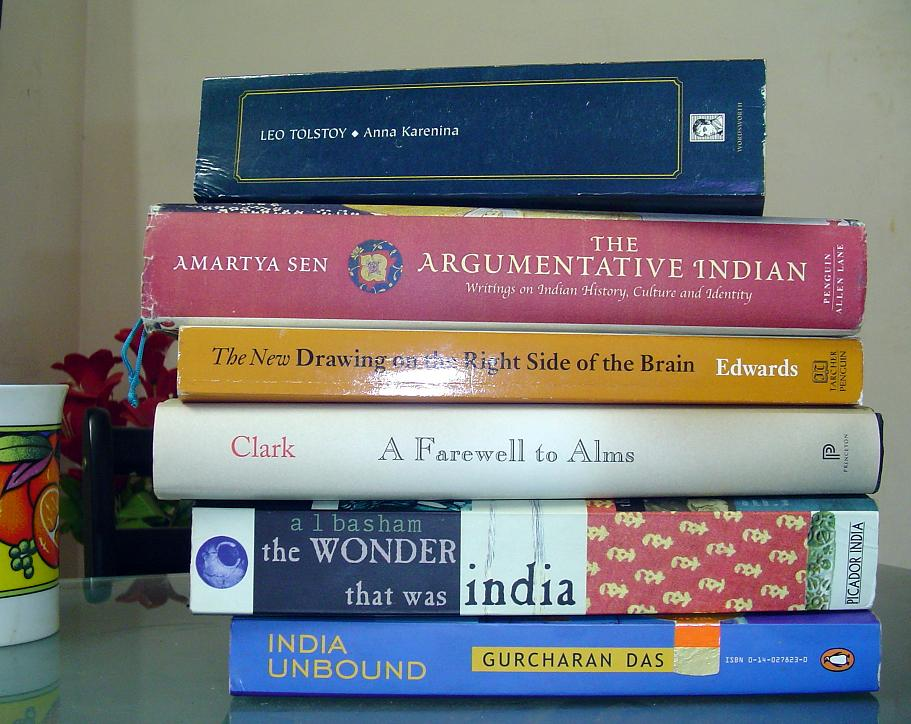
Modern book spine designs

The spine of the book is an important aspect in book design, especially in cover design. When the books are stacked up or stored in a shelf, what is on the spine is the only visible information about the book. In a bookstore, the details on the spine are what initially attract attention.

== Notable people ==
- Guild of Women-Binders
- Katharine Adams
- William Anthony
- Florimond Badier
- George A. Baer
- Matilde Calvo Rodero
- Douglas Cockerell
- Otto Fein
- Jane Bissell Grabhorn
- James Hayday
- Carolyn Price Horton
- Fortino Jaime
- Paul Kersten
- Polly Lada-Mocarski
- Suenonius Mandelgreen
- Faith Shannon
- Gligorije Vozarević
- Ignatz Wiemeler
- Archibald Winterbottom
- Joseph Zaehnsdorf

== See also ==
- Bindery
- Book folding
- Book rebinding
- Bookbindings in the British Library
- Destinies of the Soul – a book bound in human skin
- Orihon – Type of manuscript
- Prebound
- Prize book
- Stiffening
- Swell (bookbinding)
- Wasōbon – Japanese traditional bookbinding
