= William Mansell =

William Mansell may refer to:

- William Mansell, gamekeeper, see Clumber Spaniel
- William Clifford (priest), alias Mansell
- William Mansell, owner of James Hayday bookbinders

== See also ==
- William Mansel (disambiguation)
