= Secret Belgian binding =

Method of bookbinding

The Secret Belgian Binding is a method of bookbinding that uses a primary and a secondary sewing, resulting in a distinct thread pattern on the cover and spine of the finished book. The primary sewing is used to create the textblock. The secondary sewing is used to bind the textblock to the cover boards.

== History ==
This binding was invented in the mid-1980s by Anne Goy, a Belgian bookbinder. She was looking for a Western version of the traditional Japanese stab binding techniques. She wanted a book that would open flat but with the appearance of the stab sewing. Anne Goy calls this binding the "crisscross binding".

== Methods and materials ==
The book cover is made using three separate pieces: front cover, back cover, and spine piece. The covers are attached by sewing through holes on the cover boards and passing over and under the spine piece. The previously sewn textblock is attached when the threads that pass under the spine piece also pass through the stitches on the spine of the textblock. The spine piece is held in place only by these threads passing over and under it. It creates a distinct thread pattern on the cover and it is a very sturdy binding that allows the book to open completely flat.
