= Finishing (bookbinding) =

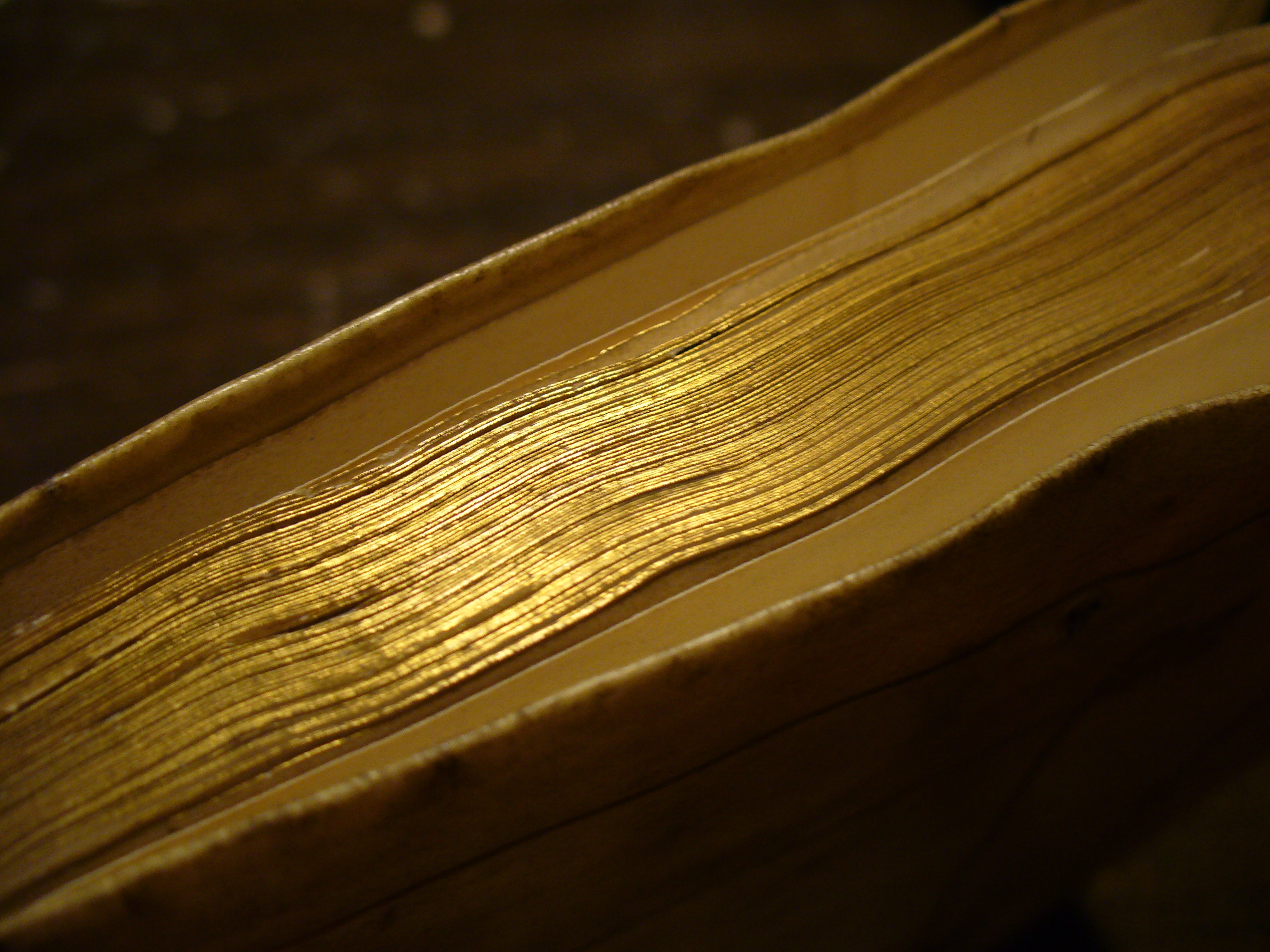
The gilded page edges of Robert Hayman's Quodlibets, a book published in the hand-press period

In bookbinding, finishing refers to the process of decorating the outside of a book, including the lettering of the spine and covers, any additional tooling, and any inlays and onlays. Finishing can also include the gilding or other decoration of the edges of the book's pages.

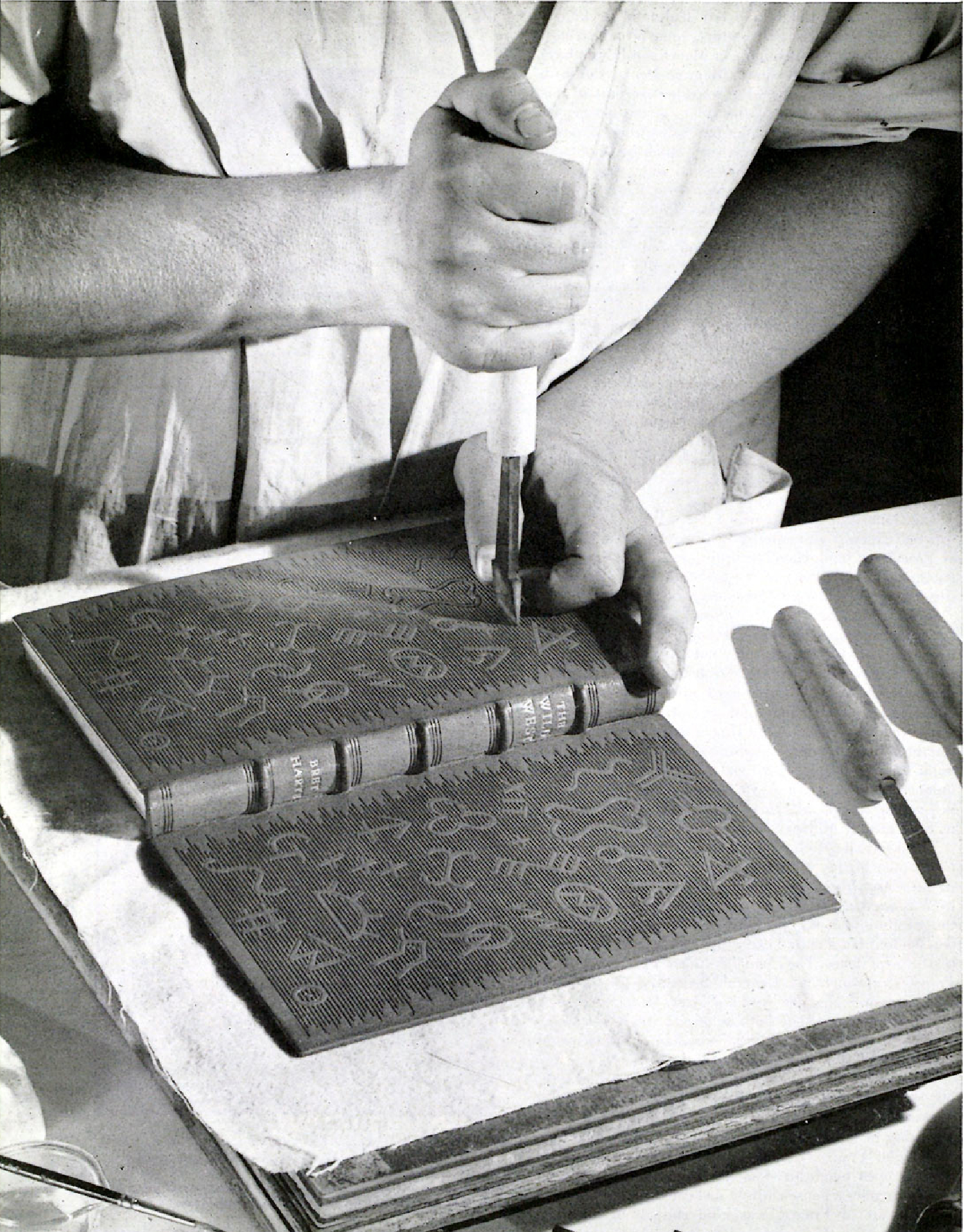
Example of blind tooling a book binding with exquisite detail

Early codices, such as Coptic bindings, had relatively simple finishing, including blind tooling and leather strips woven through covering material.

In traditional bookbinding, finishing is done by hand, and is a highly skilled process. Until the second half of the 20th century, finishing was largely performed by men who specialized in gilding; they would receive the book after the process of sewing and covering the book, known as forwarding, was complete.

In the broadest sense, any book with decoration other than its covering material (such as a title) can be considered finished, though the term is usually applied only to books that have been decorated extensively by hand.
