= Florimond Badier =

French bookbinder (17th century)

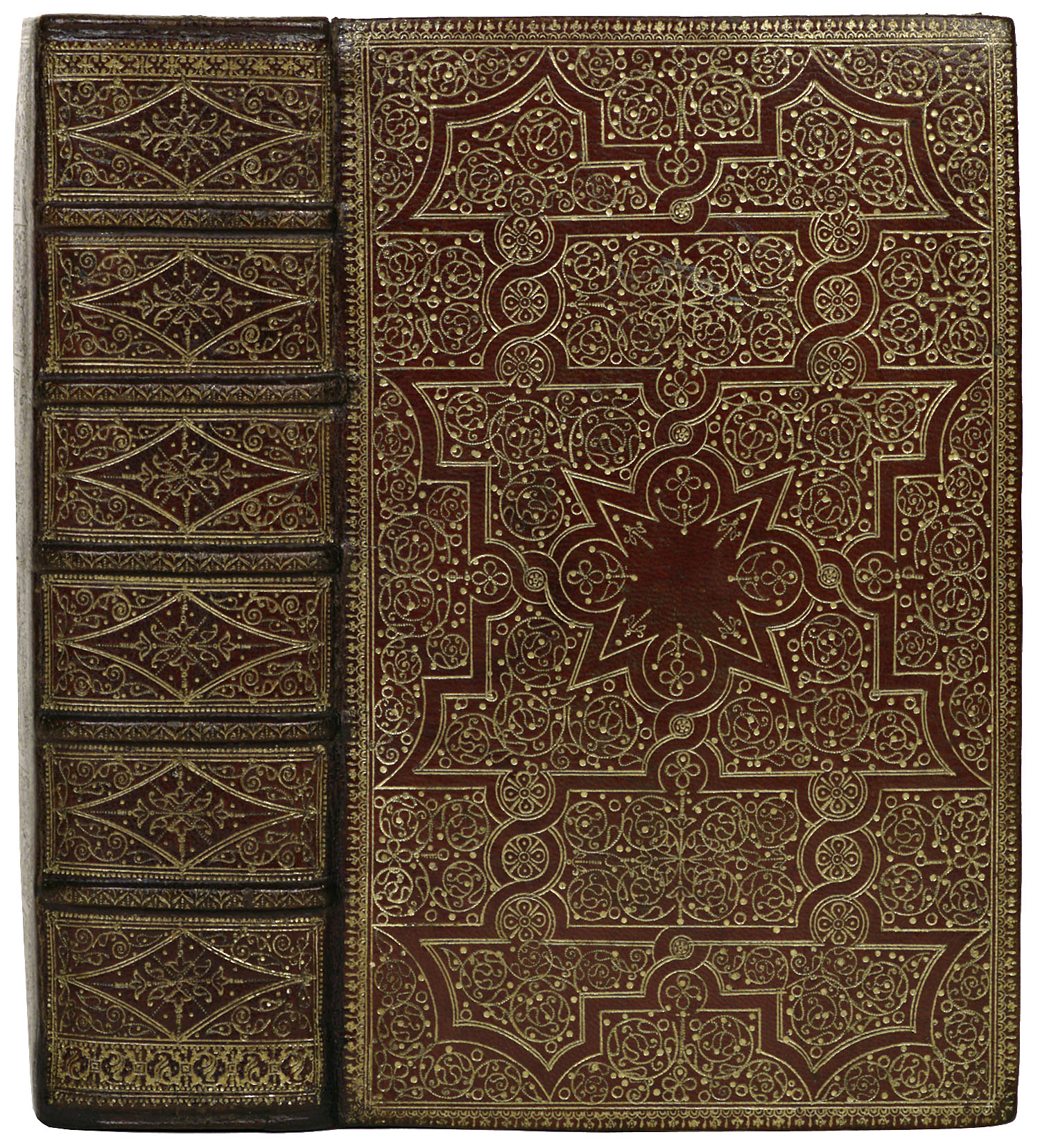
Red Morocco leather binding by Florimond Badier or his workshop, in the Royal Library of the Netherlands (The Hague)

Florimond Badier (died c. 1668) was a French bookbinder.

Little is known about the life of Florimond Badier. He became an apprentice binder in 1630. He was a journeyman 1636–1645 and became a master craftsman on 6 July 1645. His work is known through three signed bindings, which is highly unusual: no other French bookbinder from the 17th century is known to have signed their work in this way. He appears to have been head of a workshop that operated, with an intermission 1659–1662, until 1668. The production of Badier, and the other artisans of the workshop, are characterised by filigree bindings, decorative frames in the shape of groups of flowers, and distinct groups of ornaments spaced out over the cover.
