= Limp binding =

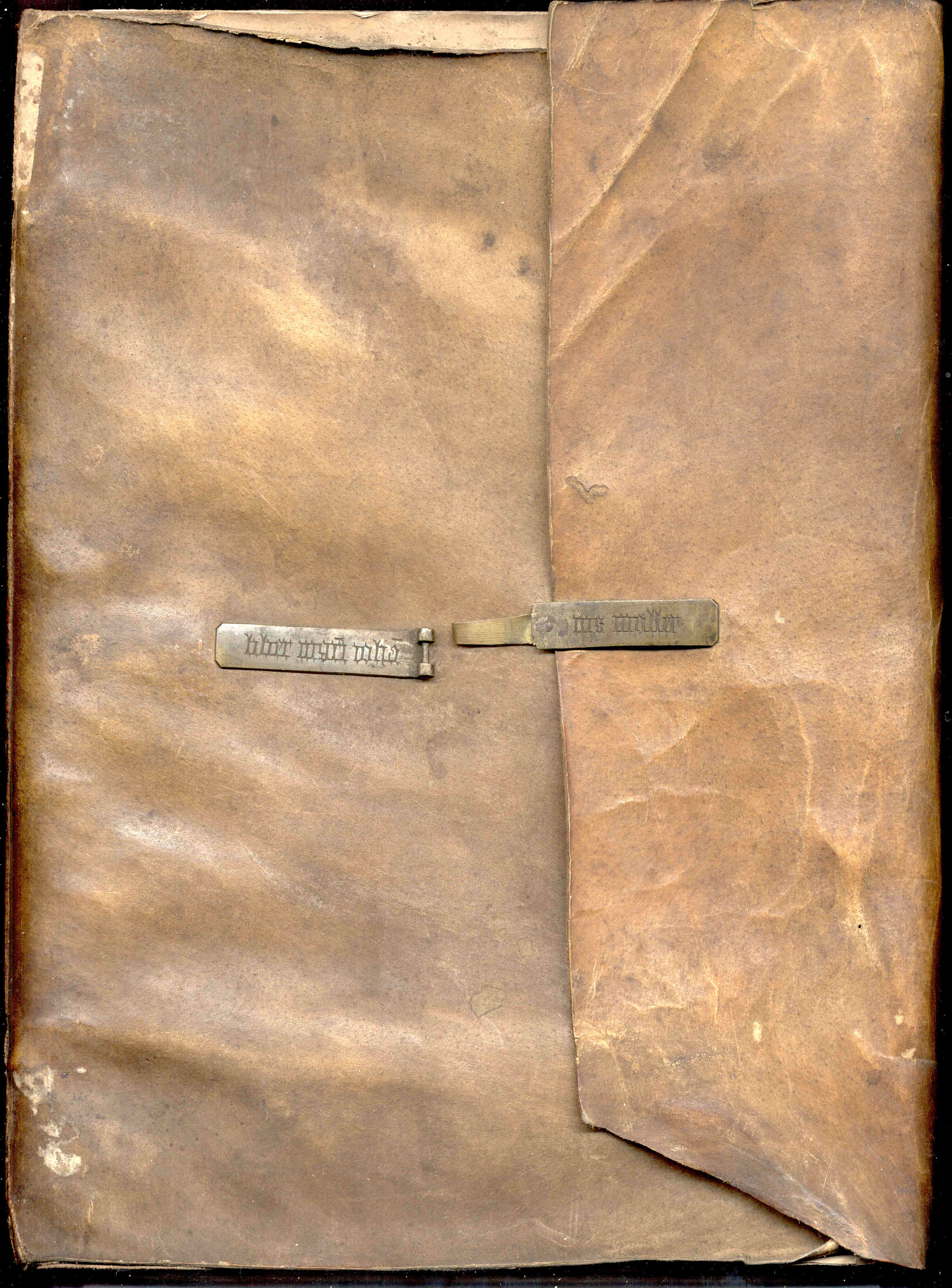
Limp binding of an incunable, made of vellum with broken book clasp of the 15th century

Limp binding is a bookbinding method in which the book has flexible cloth, leather, vellum, or (rarely) paper sides. When the sides of the book are made of vellum, the bookbinding method is also known as limp vellum.

The cover is made with a single piece of vellum or alternative material, folded around the textblock, the front and back covers being folded double. The quires are sewn onto sewing supports such as cords or alum-tawed thongs and the tips of the sewing supports would be laced into the cover. The thongs could also be used at the fore edge of the covers to create a closure or tie.

In limp binding the covering material is not stiffened by thick boards, although paste-downs, if used, provide some stiffness; some limp bindings are only adhered to the back of the book. Some limp vellum bindings had yapp edges that flop over to protect the textblock.

== Usage ==
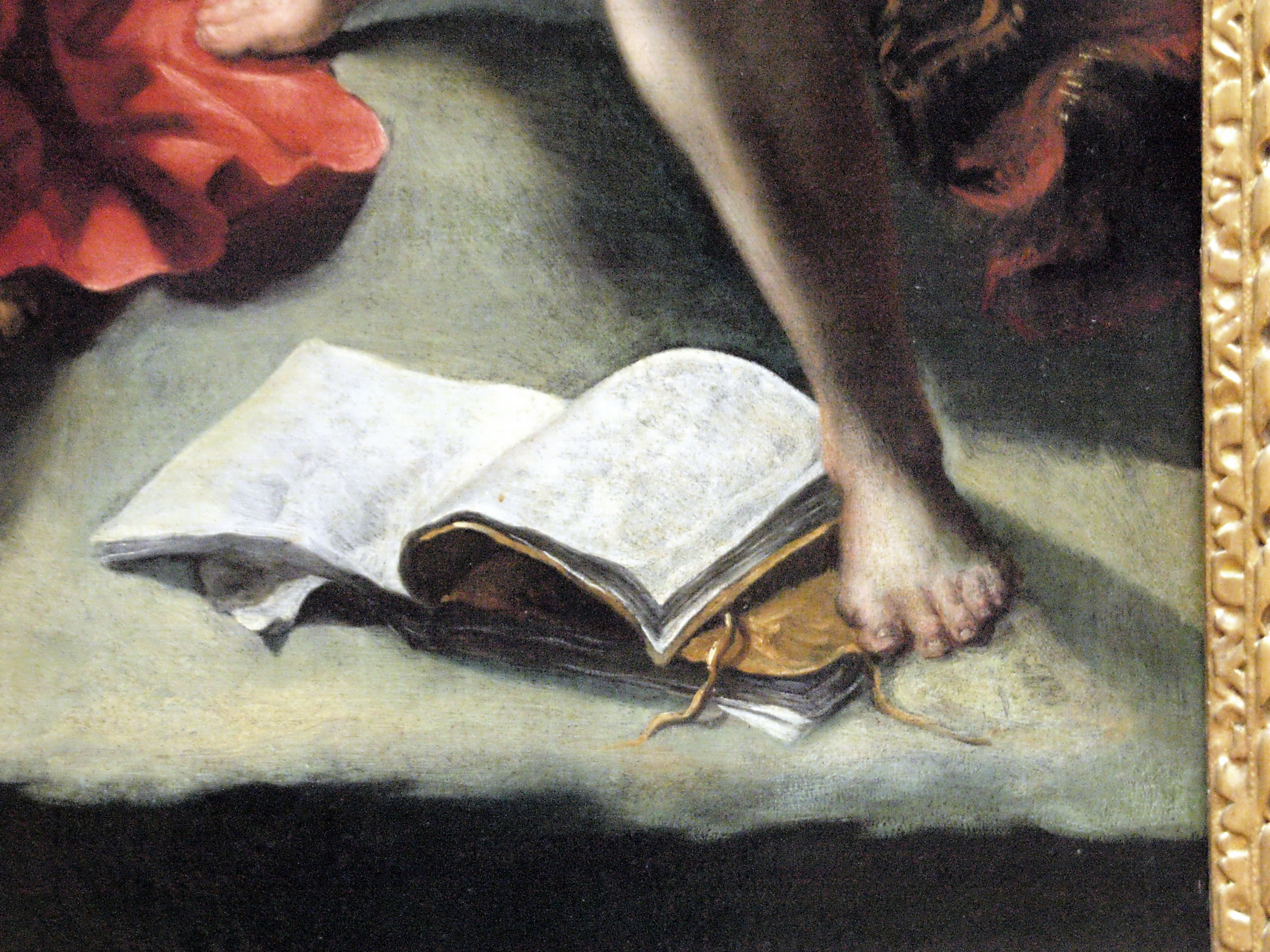
Orazio Borgianni, detail of The Vision of St Jerome, standing on a limp vellum bound book with fore-edge ties.

Limp vellum bindings for commonplace books were being produced at least as early as the 14th century and probably earlier, but it was not usually common until the 16th and 17th centuries. Its usage subsequently declined until "revived by the private presses near the end of the 19th century". From about 1775 to 1825, limp leather was commonly used for pocket books, but by the 1880s limp bindings came to be largely restricted to devotional books, diaries, and sentimental verse, sometimes with yapp edges. Yapp edges are bent edges on a limp binding projecting beyond the textblock to reduce damage. They are often found in editions of the Bible.

== Bibliography ==
- Langwe, Monica (2006). Limp bindings from Tallinn. Sollerön: Langwe form. ISBN 978-91-631-8858-9.
