= Otto Fein =

German bookbinder and photographer (1906–1966)

Otto Fein (1906–1966) was a bookbinder and photographer who worked at the Kulturwissenschaftliche Bibliothek Warburg in Germany and later in the United Kingdom after the original library migrated to London in 1933. Fein sometimes used the name Hugo Otto Fein, for example in publications in which his images featured, such as the Warburg Institute Publications. He died in 1966; his death was registered in Havering, London.

== Biography ==
Fein was born in 1906 in Germany. He began his working life in 1927 at the Kulturwissenschaftliche Bibliothek Warburg in Hamburg as a bookbinder. He was to stay with this organisation for the rest of his working life. This private library was founded by Aby Warburg (1886–1929), an art historian who was interested in the social and cultural context in which art was made. With the rise of the Nazi Party in Germany, Adolf Hitler came to power in 1933. Consequently, in that year, following an invitation of an ad hoc committee and supported by eminent philanthropists such as Lord Lee of Fareham, Samuel Courtauld and Warburg's family, what came to be called the Warburg Institute moved to London late in 1933.

== Career ==
On moving its collections to London many of the Warburg's staff migrated to continue their work and Fein was amongst this group. The collections included medieval manuscripts and rare early printed books, and these found a new home, first in South Kensington. In 1944, the collection was incorporated into the University of London.

Alongside Fein's bookbinding duties he photographed manuscripts and worked with Irene Koppel until 1937 when she emigrated to New Zealand. Fein became head of the photographic studio at the Warburg and used state of the art photographic equipment to produce images that were included in academic works ensuring that the Warburg Institute remained on a par, academically and technically, with similar institutions.

At the outbreak of the Second World War, Fein became involved with the National Buildings Record. The buildings photographed by him included the British Museum, 10 Downing Street, and the Royal Effigies at Westminster Abbey. Such images would have provided a systematic record of the buildings if they were destroyed by bombing.

Fein continued his work on photographing manuscripts, including the St Alban's Psalter, and he frequently collaborated with other German emigres such as Walter Gernsheim. Another fruitful collaboration was with Fritz Saxl, with whom he toured England to record examples of English Romanesque sculptures. Such were Fein's technical skills that he was sought after by galleries such as the National Gallery and the Courtauld Gallery to provide assistance for exhibitions such as 'British Art and the Mediterranean'. Most of the images in the published book of the same title are attributed to him.

Fein became an Associate Member of the Royal Photographic Society. His death was announced in the Society's journal in 1967.

== Death and legacy ==
Fein's death in 1967 was recorded in an obituary in The Journal of the Warburg and Courtauld Institutes, where there is included references to published works in which he made important photographic contributions including L.D. Ettlinger's The Sistine Chapel Before Michelangelo, 1965, Clarendon Press and the St. Alban's Psalter.

Examples of his photographic work in places such as Woburn Abbey are available for scholars of art history and iconography to view.

Mention of his technical skill appears in the book Applied Arts in British Exile from 1933: Changing Visual and Material Culture.

Photographs attributed to Fein appear in the Conway Library Collection at the Courtauld Institute of Art.

Perhaps the most important legacy Fein left us with was that of a man who, in 1934, found himself facing a critical decision of whether to leave or stay in his homeland. His 1967 obituary in The Journal of the Warburg and Courtauld Institutes includes the following: "His share in making the working of the Warburg Institute known outside Germany – a country he did not have to leave – was a large one. He is greatly remembered."
