= James Hayday =

British bookbinder (1796–1872)

James Hayday (1796–1872), was a British bookbinder.

== Biography ==
Born in London in 1796, he served his time with Charles Marchant, vellum-binder, 12 Gloucester Street, Queen Square, and then for some time worked as a journeyman. In 1825 he became one of the auditors of the Journeymen Bookbinders' Trade Society. He commenced business in a very humble way. In 1833 he rented premises at 31 Little Queen Street, Lincoln's Inn Fields, where he continued until his retirement in 1861.

Hayday had long seen that it was desirable to make printed books open freely and lie flat; his attention is believed to have been drawn to this matter by seeing Bagster's polyglot bibles, which were bound by Joseph Welsh of 10 Queen Street, Golden Square, in what was known as ‘Bagster's Renowned Binding.’ These books were made flexible, and covered with purple pin-headed sealskin with a blind tool ornament. In his own binding he sewed the books all along every sheet, and to remedy the extra thickness that would be caused by sewing with thread, used silk, and to equalise the thickness rounded the fore edges more than was customary. To make the back tight he dispensed with the ordinary backing of paper, and fastened the leather cover down to the back. Still the constant opening of the book disfigured the grain of the leather, and to obviate this he introduced the cross or pin-headed grain, or what is now termed Turkey Morocco.

Works bound by Hayday became famous, and his name attached to a book raised its value twenty-five per cent. Edward Gardner of the Oxford Warehouse, 7 Paternoster Row, secured Hayday's services for the Oxford books exclusively. William Pickering, bookseller, of 57 Chancery Lane, gave him the benefit of his long experience, and introduced him to many wealthy patrons. After entering into a brief partnership with Mr. Boyce, ‘a finisher,’ he again started on his own account at 31 Little Queen Street. Unable to compete with other and cheaper binders, he was adjudicated a bankrupt on 10 June 1861.

He sold the use of his name to William Mansell, who succeeded to the bookbinding establishment. Retiring to St Leonards-on-Sea, Hayday died there on 19 March 1872, aged 76.
