= Long-stitch bookbinding =

Bookbinding technique

Sample Longstitch binding through a slotted cover

In the art of bookbinding, the longstitch technique is used for binding the sections (signatures) of a book without using glue. In Non-adhesive Binding: Books without Paste or Glue (1999) Keith A. Smith describes that binding a book with a "longstitch through a slotted cover" involves directly sewing each section through the cover, which has slots for attaching each section, and creates a pattern of staggered lines that is visible on the spine of the book.

Another longstitch technique uses the chain stitch to fasten sections, and was used in parchment-covered books with reinforced spines, in the 1375–1500 period. The sections were sewn directly through holes in the cover material, with two sections being sewn through each row of holes, which allowed the creation of a chain stitch at the first sewing station and at the last sewing station.

Sample binding using Longstitch and Chain Stitch combination

There are many ways to elaborate on the simple longstitch binding. Besides altering the stitching pattern to include crosses, altering the length of the longstitches to have their own patterns, and other patterns, artists have also used multiple colored thread. There are also a number of different ways to close a longstitch book. Though some longstitch bound book covers are just trimmed to the edge of the book block, there are a variety of ways to fold over one side of the cover and fasten it. Buttons can be stitched into the binding and a thread attached to the cover flap. A slit can also be cut into the front cover and a strip from the back cover can be slipped through the slit. Modern book artists have elaborated on closure styles.
