= William Mansel (disambiguation) =

William Mansel may refer to:

- William Lort Mansel, an English churchman and academic, Master of Trinity College, Cambridge and Bishop of Bristol
- William Mansel (MP for Gloucestershire), see Gloucestershire (UK Parliament constituency)
- Sir William Mansel, 7th Baronet (1670–c.1732) of the Mansel Baronets
- Sir William Mansel, 9th Baronet (1739–1804) of the Mansel Baronets, MP for Carmarthenshire (UK Parliament constituency)
- Sir William Mansel, 10th Baronet (1766–1829) of the Mansel Baronets

== See also ==
- William Mansell (disambiguation)
