= Swell (bookbinding) =

In bookbinding, swell refers to the increased thickness of a textblock along its spine edge after sewing. Swell is a function of the number of sections in the book, the kind of paper used, the style of sewing, and the thickness of the sewing thread. Human factors also influence swell, especially the force with which the bookbinder "bones down", or flattens, each section after sewing.

Prior to the 15th century, swell in textblocks was accommodated, if at all, by shaping the wooden boards that formed a book's covers. The inner surface of each board would be lightly tapered along the spine edge, so that the removed wood created a space for the thicker paper along the sewn folds. By the 15th century, though, the process of rounding and backing became common, and books were given their characteristic rounded spines and shoulders. This mushroom-like shape compensates for the swell of the book by using the extra thickness to create an extra surface against which the boards of the book can rest.

Flat backs, or books without curved spines, should ideally have no swell. Books with rounded backs, or curved spines, however, require swell. Too little swell results in insufficient backing, and the book will lack proper shoulders. Too much swell, however, causes the spine to become over-round, and can create a propensity among the middle sections of the book to collapse inwards, falling toward the fore edge.
