= Tooling (bookbinding) =

Book decoration method

Tooling in bookbinding is the decoration of a book by impressing engraved tools into the spine, boards, edges of boards, inside of boards, and/or edges of the bookblock (the group of leaves that make up the book). Tooling can be blind, where no additional decoration is applied, or can use metal leaf, most commonly gold. The word "tooling" implies the use of handheld tools; impressions can also be made with a blocking press using metal type or plates, in which case the process is "blocking."

Sometimes particularities of specific finishing tools can be connected to a finisher or bookbinder and help to attribute the binding.

Most of what is described below applies to European and American bookbinding; there were different styles in other areas of the world. Not all binding traditions use tooled decoration.

== Tools ==
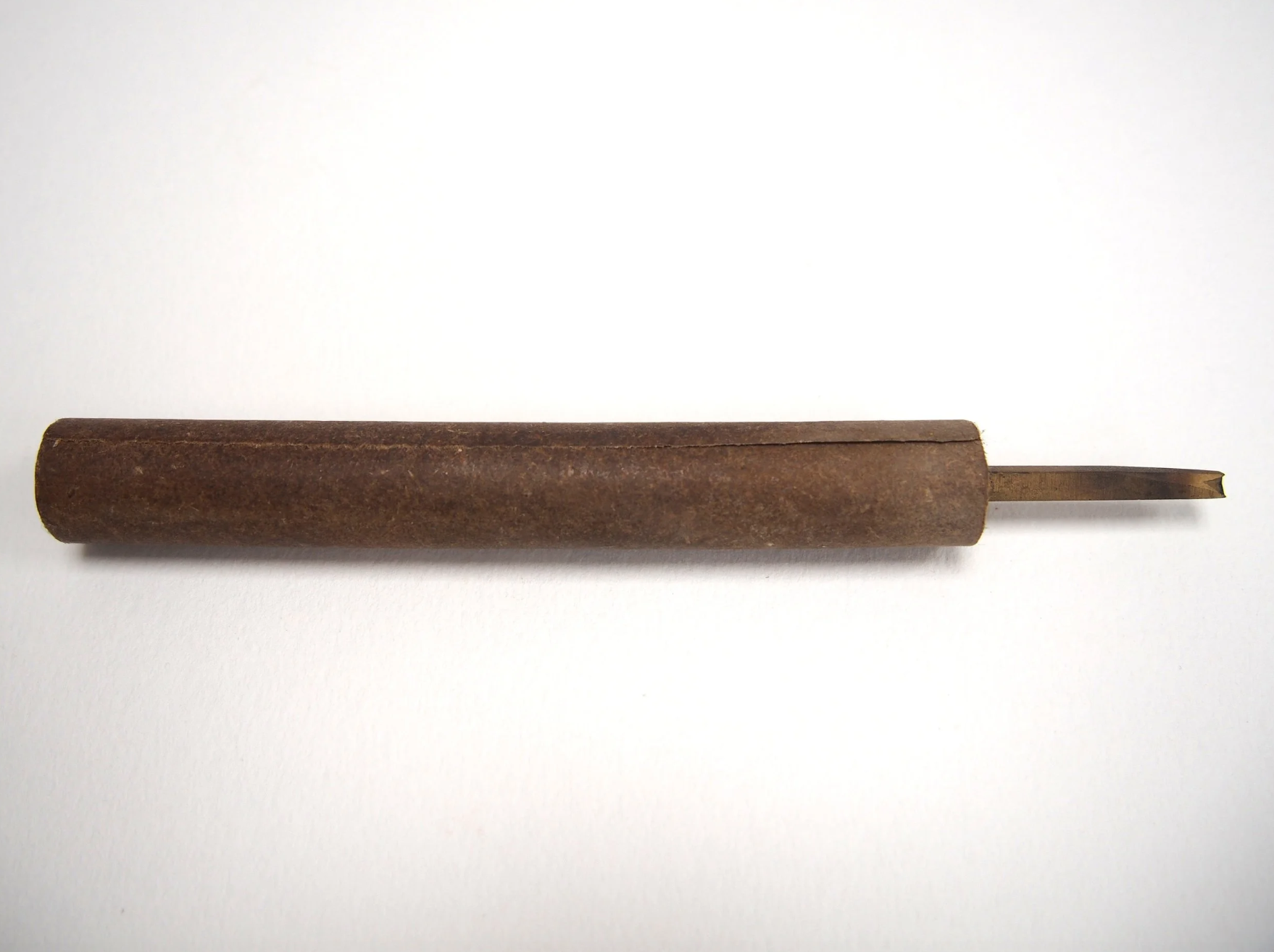
A rolled asbestos paper handle on a finishing tool for bookbinding

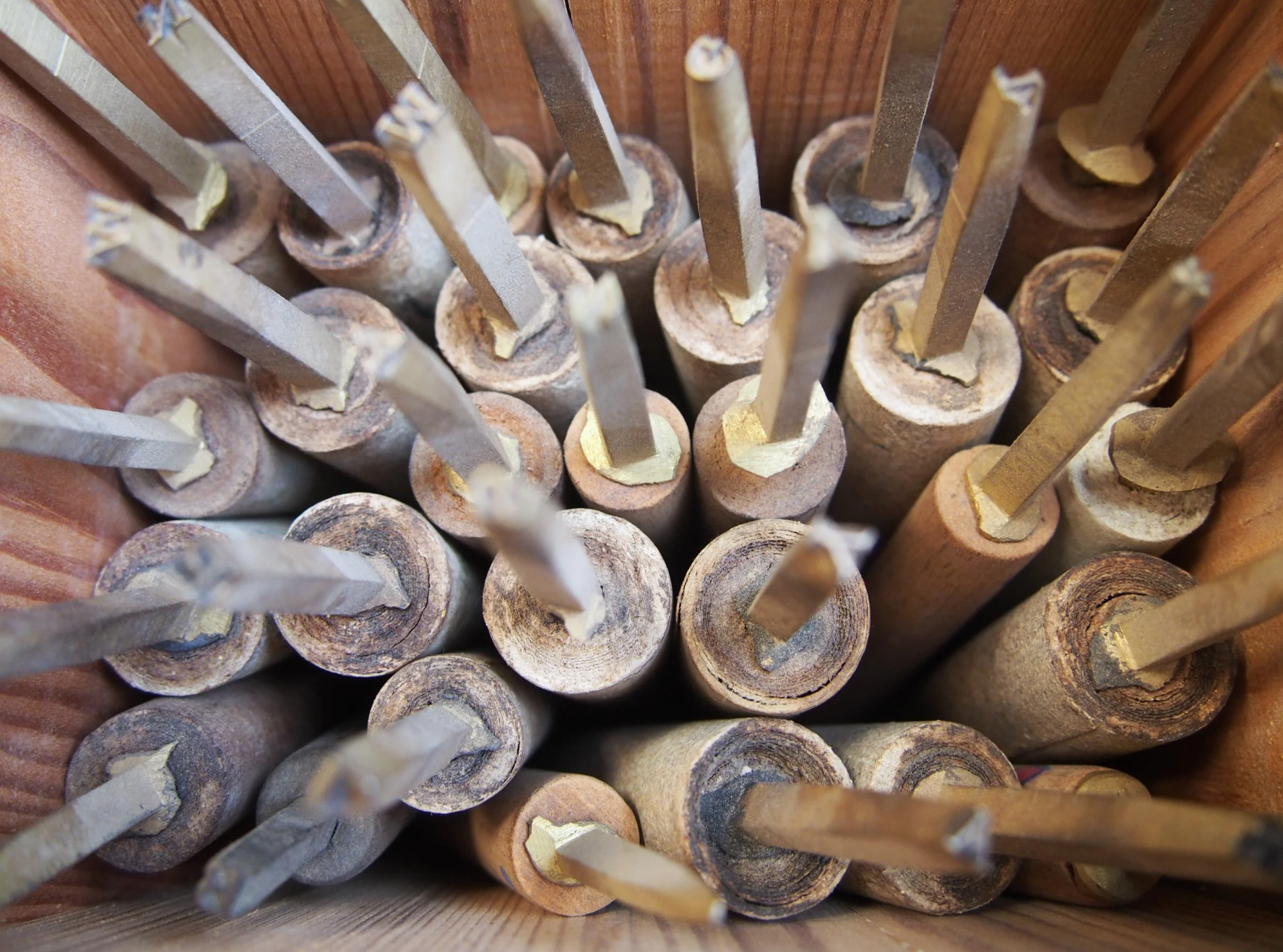
Looking into a box of finishing tools mostly with asbestos handles—the five skinnier handles are wood.

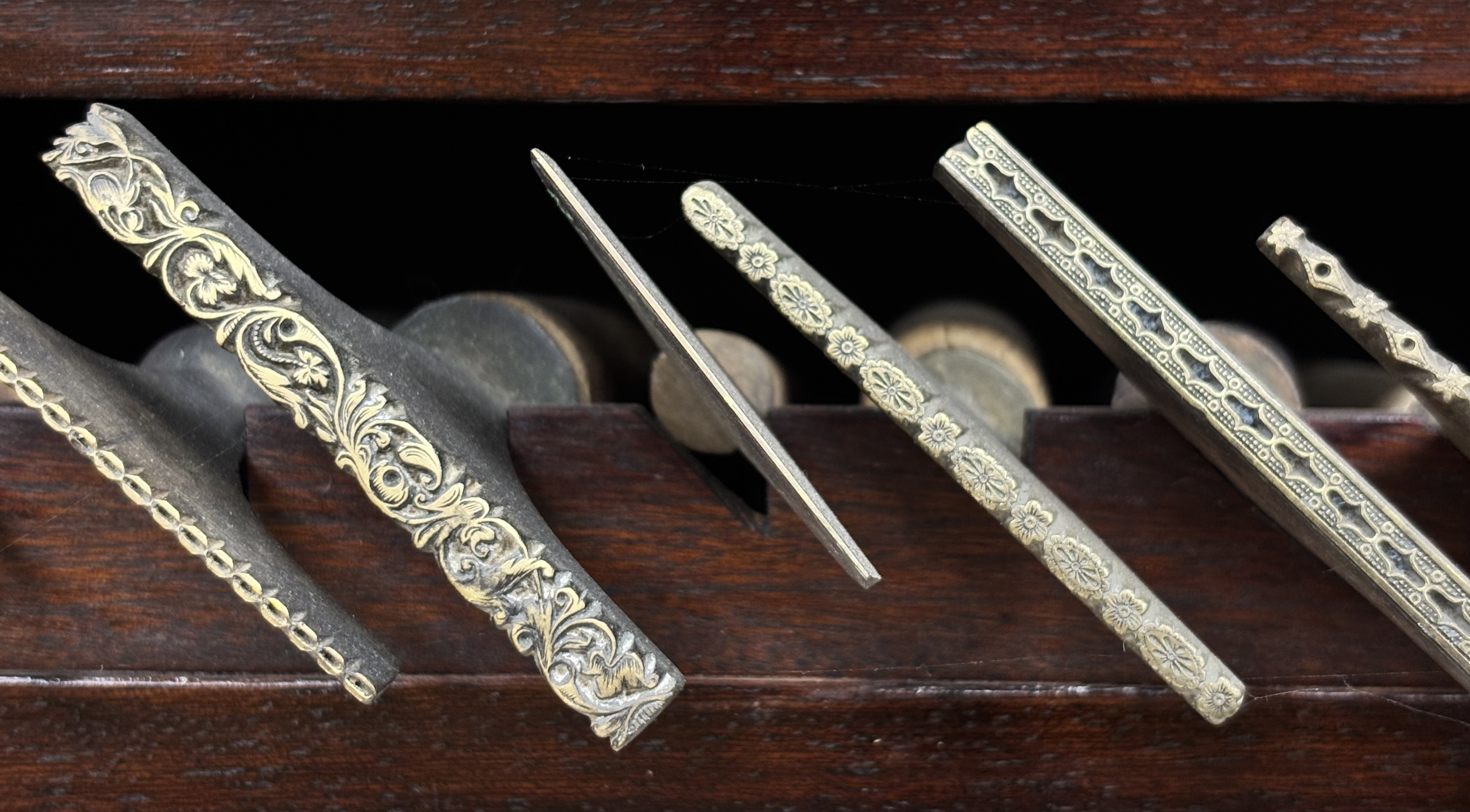
Single line (middle) and decorative pallets for tooling lines on bookbindings

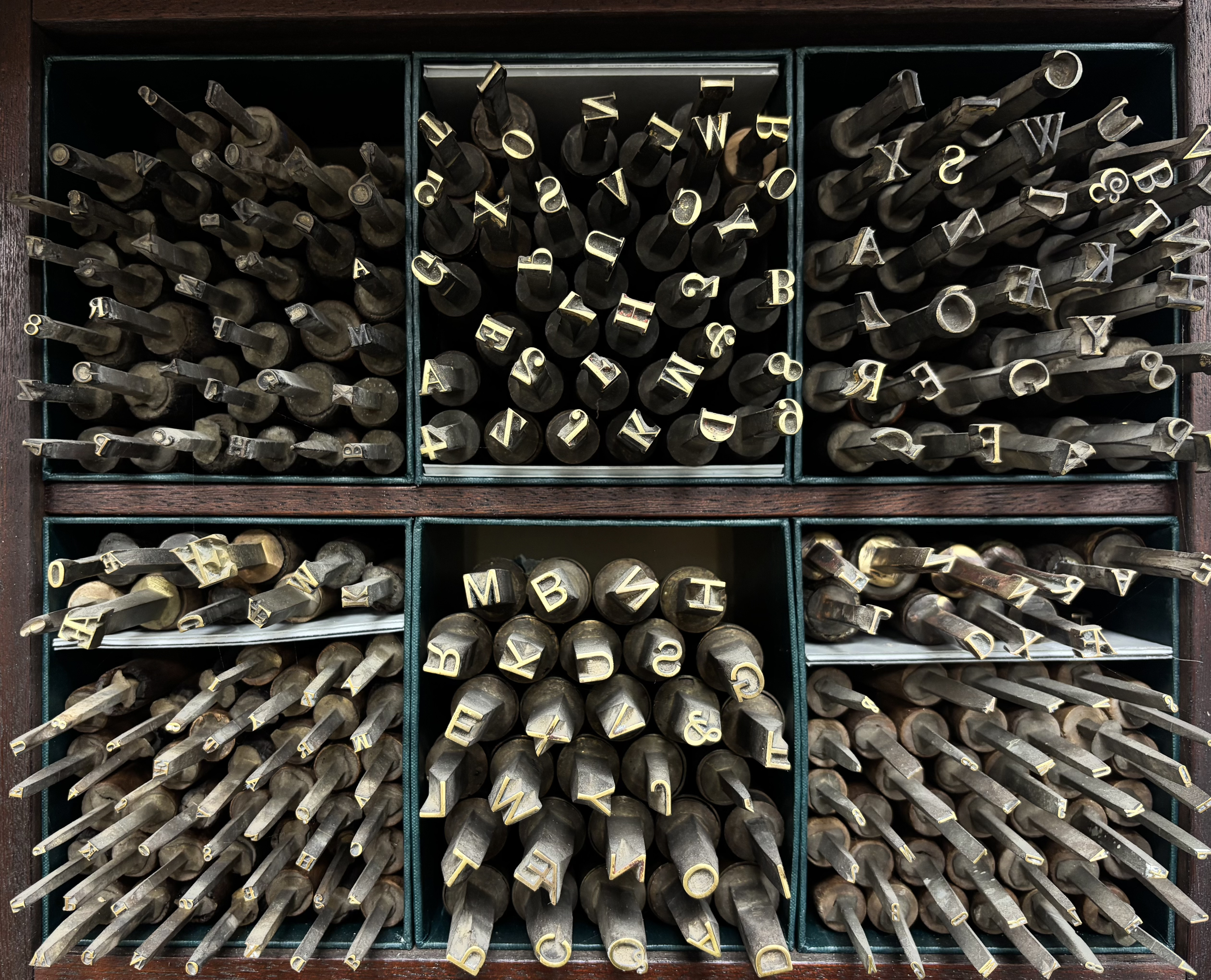
Handle letters for bookbinding in various typefaces, for adding text like title, author, date to bindings.

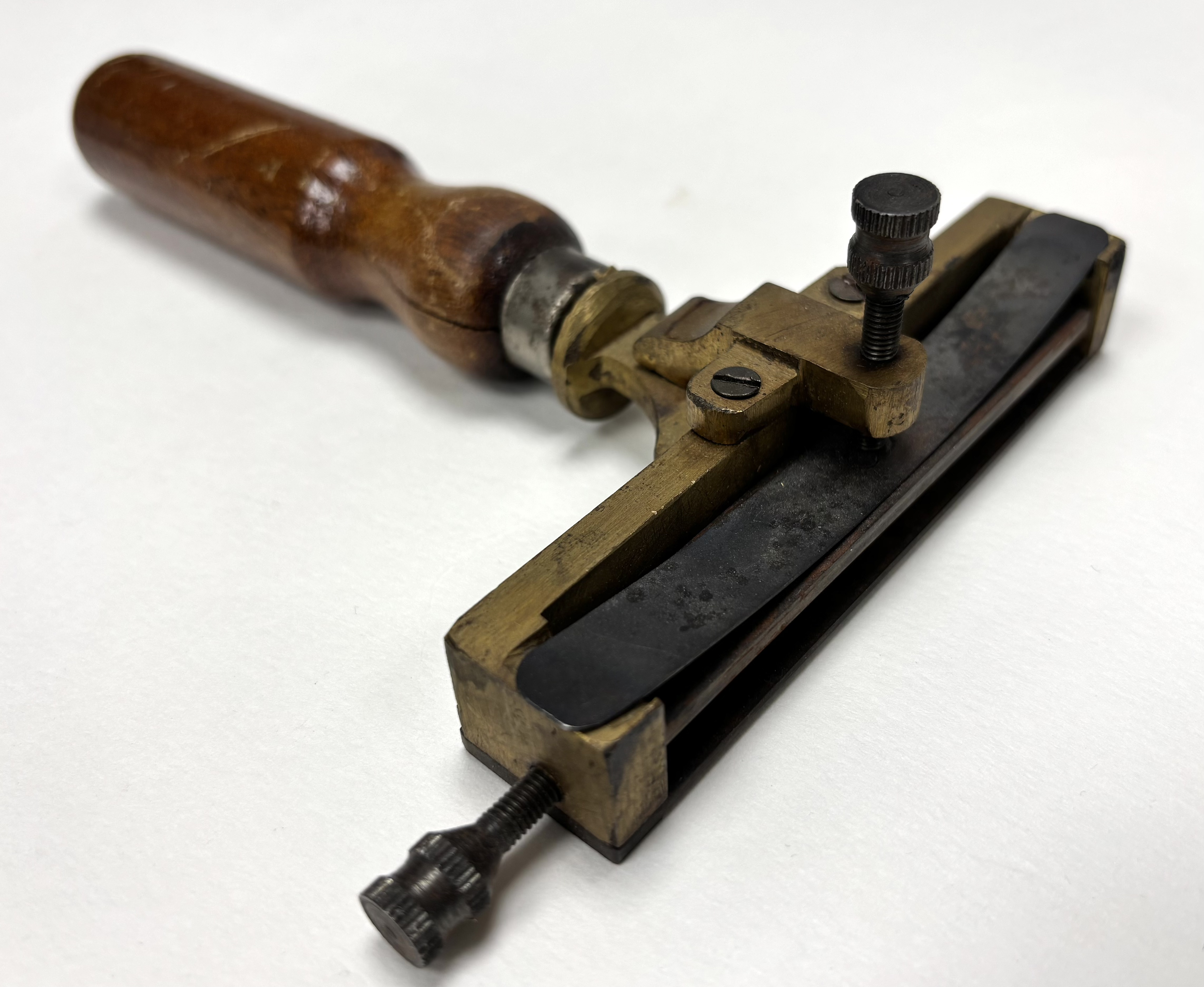
Type holder, for holding individual brass or lead type for lettering spines in bookbinding

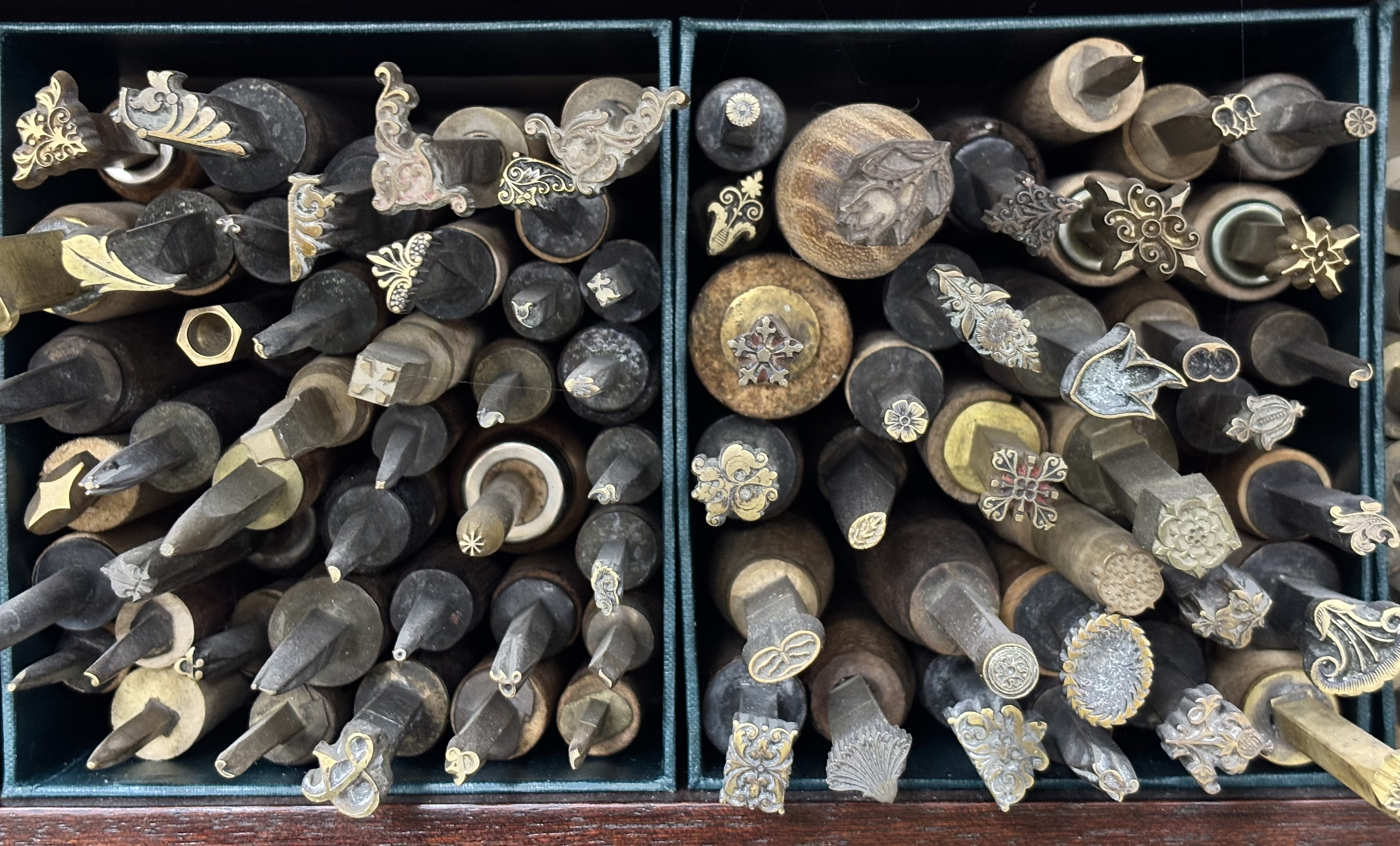
Decorative tools, including flowers, circles, stars, and leaves, for decorating bookbindings

The same tools are used for blind and gold tooling. The tool end is almost always made of copper alloy but other metals may be seen, particularly in DIY tool collections. Handles are generally made of wood, although nylon and asbestos were also used in 20th century England and may still be seen in used tool collections. Sometimes wooden handles had a metal ring at the tool end to help secure the tool in the handle, but it is also possible that this is asbestos, and users of historic collections of tools, particularly in the UK, US, and Canada should be aware to watch out for this.

The metal face is kept clean and polished for an even impression on the leather, stored in a way that keeps the face (that makes the impression) from touching anything. If the face becomes damaged, a good impression cannot be made.

=== Handle letters ===
Handle letters each bear a single letter or piece of punctuation—so an English-language set would have at least 26 tools, often also with a tool each for a full stop (period), ampersand (&), and hyphen. They are almost always capital letters only. When handle letters are used imperfect, some may have a deeper or differently angled impression than others, as each is pressed individually into the covering.

=== Type holders ===
A later alternative to handle letters is the type holder or lettering pallet, which is a handled tool that holds a set of metal type. Type made for bookbinding is brass, but lead type for letterpress printing can also be used if the temperature doesn't get too hot, at which point the type can soften or even melt.

=== Decorative tools ===
Instead of letters, tools can bear all manner of individual decorations, from little dots and stars to flowers, animals, geometric shapes, etc. Some decorative tools have specific names and purposes.

==== Corners ====
Corners are mirrored pairs of designs intended for the corners of panels (areas between bands) on the spine. 18th century French dentelle bindings (à la dentelle) use hundreds of smaller decorative tools on the boards to work up a larger pattern almost like lace around the edges of the boards.

==== Centrepieces ====
Centrepieces or centrestamps are larger detailed tools designed for the centres of boards, particularly in the 16th and 17th century in Europe. Smaller tools like this could be used in the centre of panels, sometimes with matching corners.

=== Pallets ===
Pallets are linear tools that can be straight lines (single-line pallets, double-line pallets, etc.), wavy or otherwise decorative lines, or something more elaborate like a floral pattern arranged in a line. The face may be flat, in which case it is meant for tooling the curved spine of a book, or domed, which is more useful for the flat boards or board edges—in each case one domed surface (book or tool) meets a flat surface, allowing pressure to be applied to one point at a time rather than all together. A straight line pallet may be used in conjunction with a fillet on the boards.

=== Fillets ===
Fillets create lines but the tool is a wheel shape rather than a straight line (or parallel lines), allowing a continuous, long line to be impressed. They are used on the boards, rather than the spine, where longer lines are desired, and may be matched with a pallet to create corners in a rectangular design. The handle of a fillet is long to allow it to be braced against the shoulder to apply steady pressure.

=== Decorative rolls ===
Decorative rolls are the other type of wheel-shaped tool, bearing designs more complicated than lines or dots, such as florals. They could be cut in intaglio (positive space cut away, so it looks like the background "prints") or relief (negative space cut away).

=== Gouges ===
Gouges make single arcs, and if put together could be used to form circles. A full set of gouges would have more and less tightly curved arcs.

== Blind tooling ==
Blind tooling relies on making an impression in the covering, so it works better on leather and alum taw than on parchment or other coverings. The impression may also darken somewhat in leather depending on the original colour and type of skin.

=== The history of blind tooling ===
Blind tooling can at least be traced back to Coptic bindings of the 7th and 8th centuries, if not earlier. It remained the decoration style in Europe until the 16th century when gold was introduced, although blind tooling continued to be used after this as well.

=== The process of blind tooling ===
The surface of the leather is made slightly damp, and the level of moisture balanced with the heat of the tool: the hotter the tool, the less moisture required. If too much moisture is used for the amount of heat, the leather will reach its shrinkage temperature and contract. A first impression is made lightly, then a second in which the tool is very slightly rocked or slid across as appropriate to further darken and polish the impression.

== Gold tooling ==
In gold tooling, gold leaf is transferred to the impression. Other metals can be used although gold is most common: copper alloy leaf is gold in colour, but can tarnish; silver can't effectively be used because it tarnishes so quickly but platinum can provide a silver colour.

=== The process of gold tooling ===
The process varies somewhat depending on the practitioner; some common practice is outlined below.

==== Preparing the leather ====
If leather is to be tooled, sometimes it is first wiped with a paste wash (dilute wheat starch paste). This is variously said to add moisture to the skin, helping the gold to adhere, or raise the texture of the grain.

==== Blinding in ====
Generally the process of gold tooling involves first making a blind impression on dry leather with a warm tool, often first through very thin paper before repeating without the paper to make a sharper impression. The goal of this impression is to mark out where the design is to be and to flatten any uneveness of the texture of the material below, which helps the gold to adhere and to be shiny.

==== Glaire ====
Gold sticks to a book cover by way of glaire (egg white), which can be wiped over the whole surface of the covering or brushed only in the blind impression with a tiny brush. Glaire can be fresh egg white, often whipped then strained, or it can be made up from dried albumen crystals. Recipes vary, including advice to add vinegar, water, glycerine, salt, ad lemon juice. A substitute off-the-shelf material can be used such as BS Glaire or Fixor, both of which are said to be formulations based on shellac forced into aqueous solution but this is not confirmed, with some speculation that Fixor is made from hide glue. Regardless of uncertainty of the proprietary formulas, there are recipes for homemade "blonde shellac glaire."

==== Tooling in gold ====
Gold leaf must be handled carefully as it weighs very little, catches the wind easily, and sticks to very small amounts of grease. It is flipped out of a booklet onto a gold cushion (leather, suede-side up, wrapped over a padded board) and cut to size. There are then two ways to apply it to the book. In the first method, the covering is lightly wiped over with some kind of grease, then the piece of leaf is picked up with a very lightly greased piece of cotton wool and pressed onto the covering, where it stays. In the other method, the tool face is wiped over lightly with greased cotton wool and tapped lightly onto a smaller piece of leaf. The tool is then pressed onto the covering, aiming to strike exactly where the blind impression was. The gold will only stick (1) where there was glaire and (2) where there was heat. Excess gold can be rubbed off dry or with a grease-dissolving solvent.

==== Making a good impression ====
Successful gold tooling depends on balancing the three factors of temperature, pressure, and dwell (time the tool lingers on the surface of the covering). The hotter the tool, the less dwell and pressure there should be; if more dwell is required for a longer working time, the temperature of the tool would need to be lowered. Different substrates (leather, parchment, cloth, etc.), as well as various sizes of tools, require a different balance of these factors, and the choice of glaire also affects the working method. Factors such as room temperature and ambient humidity can also have a dramatic impact.

== Preservation considerations ==
Blind tooling does not cause particular problems over time except that recesses are created that could collect dust or dirt and may need light cleaning over time. If poor quality leaf is used for gold tooling, a combination of acidity from the leather and humidity in the atmosphere can lead to tarnishing, but the leaf is so thin that treatment is not realistic. It is also possible for the leaf to flake off when book spines flex during use; this, combined with the benefits of a more rigid surface for executing tooling, led to less and less mobile spines throughout 19th century European binding.

== Gauffered edges ==
While they don't fall under types of decoration of covers, gauffered edges are created with the same finishing tools and so are described here. For a gauffered edge, the bookblock edge is first gilded, then warm finishing tools are used to indent the edge and create a sort of blind tooled patter on a solid gold area. It is very difficult to use larger tools, especially on the curved fore-edge, and so patterns are usually made up from smaller tools.
