= Prize book =

Award item

In the fields of bibliography and bookselling, prize books (also known as prize bindings), are a category of finely bound books once given as prizes and awards in educational institutions primarily in England, Ireland, and the Netherlands. This tradition flourished in Latin schools in continental Europe from the mid-17th century until the introduction of publishers bindings after about 1830. Books continued to be given as prizes at academic ceremonies, but the only distinguishing feature are typically special inscriptions and/or bookplates.

== History in UK ==
In the United Kingdom, the tradition of special prize bindings persisted until the mid-20th century with the demise of traditional hand binding. Most titles consist of classical works in the humanities published in unbound print runs for this purpose. Schools would contract with a local bindery to prepare prize editions stamped or embossed with the logo of the school. The editions are often made to resemble the fine bindings of the 18th century and are prized by booksellers for their classical appearance. They are often mistaken as ex-school library books but can be distinguished by a prize inscription, lack of call number, and general higher quality of the binding.
