= Faith Shannon =

British bookbinder

Faith Shannon (24 February 1938 – 24 August 2018) was a British bookbinder. Born abroad, she spent most of her life and career in the UK. She is well known for custom bindings evoking the natural world.

== Early life ==
Faith was born in India in 1938. Her mother was from Ulster and her father was Irish. When she was young she moved to Belfast, where she attended the Belfast College of Art. She specialized in painting, but also studied bookbinding. She moved to London and studied at the London School of Printing then the Royal College of Art from 1960 to 1963.

== Career ==
After graduating she worked as a freelance artist. She found bookbinding allowed her to work from home while caring for her daughters. She also painted highly realistic depictions of flowers and fruits. In 1977 she was awarded an MBE in the 1977 Silver Jubilee and Birthday Honours for services to bookbinding.

After working as a freelance designer and bookbinder for many years, she took job as a lecturer at Brighton Polytechnic in 1980. In 1987 she published a book titled Paper Pleasures about papercraft and bookbinding. She was a longtime member of the Designer Bookbinders society, and served as the society's president from 1987 to 1990.

== Personal life ==
After leaving Brighton in 1990 Shannon lived on the west coast of Scotland, where she died in 2018. She enjoyed sailing, and the rock formations of Scotland's coastal inlets served as inspiration for Stone: Ten Bindings.

== Selected works ==
- Alice Through the Looking Glass, 1973 commissioned binding of the work by Lewis Carroll, with the cover depicting Alice reaching through the mirror at the moment it turns to mist.
- The Genus Crocus, 1973 artistic binding of the original 1886 work by George Maw.
- Stone: Ten Bindings, a collection of poems by George Mackay Brown illustrated by photographs from Gunnie Moberg, exhibited in 2006.
