= William Anthony (bookbinder) =

Irish bookbinder (1926-1989)

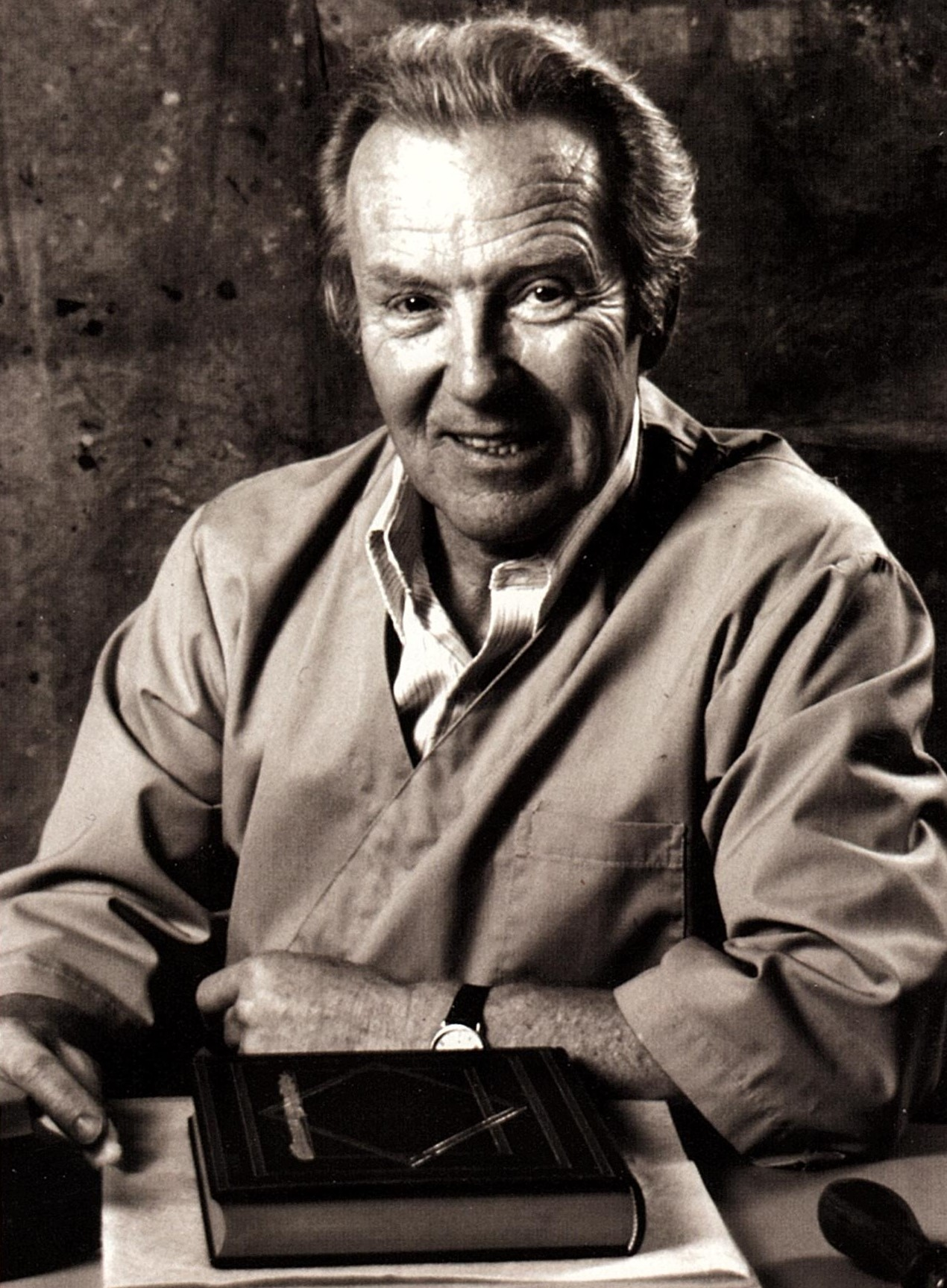
- William Anthony late 1980s
- Born: William Anthony; 9 November 1926; Waterford, Ireland
- Died: 2 February 1989 (aged 62); Iowa City, Iowa
- Occupation: Master Bookbinder
- Employers: Cuneo Press, Chicago 1964-1972; University of Iowa 1984-1989
- Spouse: Bernadette
- Children: 4

William Anthony (November 9, 1926 – February 8, 1989) was an Irish bookbinder and book conservator who spent the latter part of his career in the United States. He specialized in fine leather bindings with inlays and gold tooling and is known for his bold designs, fine craftsmanship, and mentorship of numerous bookbinders and conservators who studied with him.

== Early life and training ==
William Anthony was born in Waterford, Ireland. At the age of 17, he began a seven-year apprenticeship at a book binding company that also employed his father. After a further period of training in Dublin, Anthony became journeyman bookbinder and studied at the Camberwell College of Art in London. While working for a variety of bookbinding firms, Anthony developed his skill in fine leather bindings which qualified him for induction into the Guild of Contemporary Bookbinders (now Designers Bookbinders http://www.designerbookbinders.org.uk/). In 1963, while the 37-year-old Anthony exhibited some of his books at a Guild exposition, he met a visitor from the United States, John F. Cuneo, owner of Chicago's Cuneo Press and avid fan of fine books.

== Career in the United States ==
The Cuneo Press was a major publishing company in Chicago specializing in the printing of various magazines. In addition, John F. Cuneo's love for books led him to create a small fine bookbinding department that was used to help promote the printing department operation. At the time that Cuneo met William Anthony in England, the master binder in charge of the fine bookbinding department, George A. Baer, was seriously ill with hepatitis, and it was not clear if or when Baer would return to work. Cuneo was so impressed with Anthony's leather bindings that he offered him the job in Cuneo Press's fine binding department. Anthony, attracted by this “head of department” position, accepted the job and moved with his wife, Bernadette, and their three children to Chicago. However, by the time the Anthonys arrived in Chicago, George Baer had recovered and resumed his duties as “head of the department”, and William Anthony was given the position of “head of the Art Department” which permitted him to work occasionally on binding books until George Baer's retirement in 1970.

By 1973 it became clear that the Cuneo Press could no longer support the luxury of its fine binding department so Anthony began his transition to private practice, first via a partnership with an established Chicago bookbinder, Elisabeth Kner, followed in 1980 by his own company, Anthony and Associates. During this time, William Anthony was busy promoting the art and craft of bookbinding in the Chicago area and became a founding member of the Chicago Hand Bookbinders, which remained active until 2009.

In 1984, William Anthony was appointed University Conservator at the University of Iowa Libraries, a position he held until his death in 1989. During his five years at Iowa, he was active in establishing the conservation department as well as setting up a bookbinding studio.

Among the many students who studied with Anthony are William Minter, Mary Lynn Ritzenthaler, Pamela Spitzmueller, David Brock, Mark Esser, Lawrence Yerkes. One of his last apprentices, Annie Tremmel Wilcox, wrote a book about her experience under Anthony's tutelage.

== Artistic career ==
For most fine bookbinders, work that produces an income is not necessarily of the most artistic type. However, William Anthony combined his business activities, much of which was in book or document restoration, with fine bindings through which he expressed his artistic visions. William Anthony was one of the last bookbinders who was trained from a young age in the art of bookbinding through year-long apprenticeships and journeyman status.

== Selected books bound by William Anthony ==
The selected books bound by William Anthony are arranged in chronological order of their binding, dating from 1956 to 1985. Most can be found in the Special Collections of the University of Iowa Libraries, while others are held by private individuals.

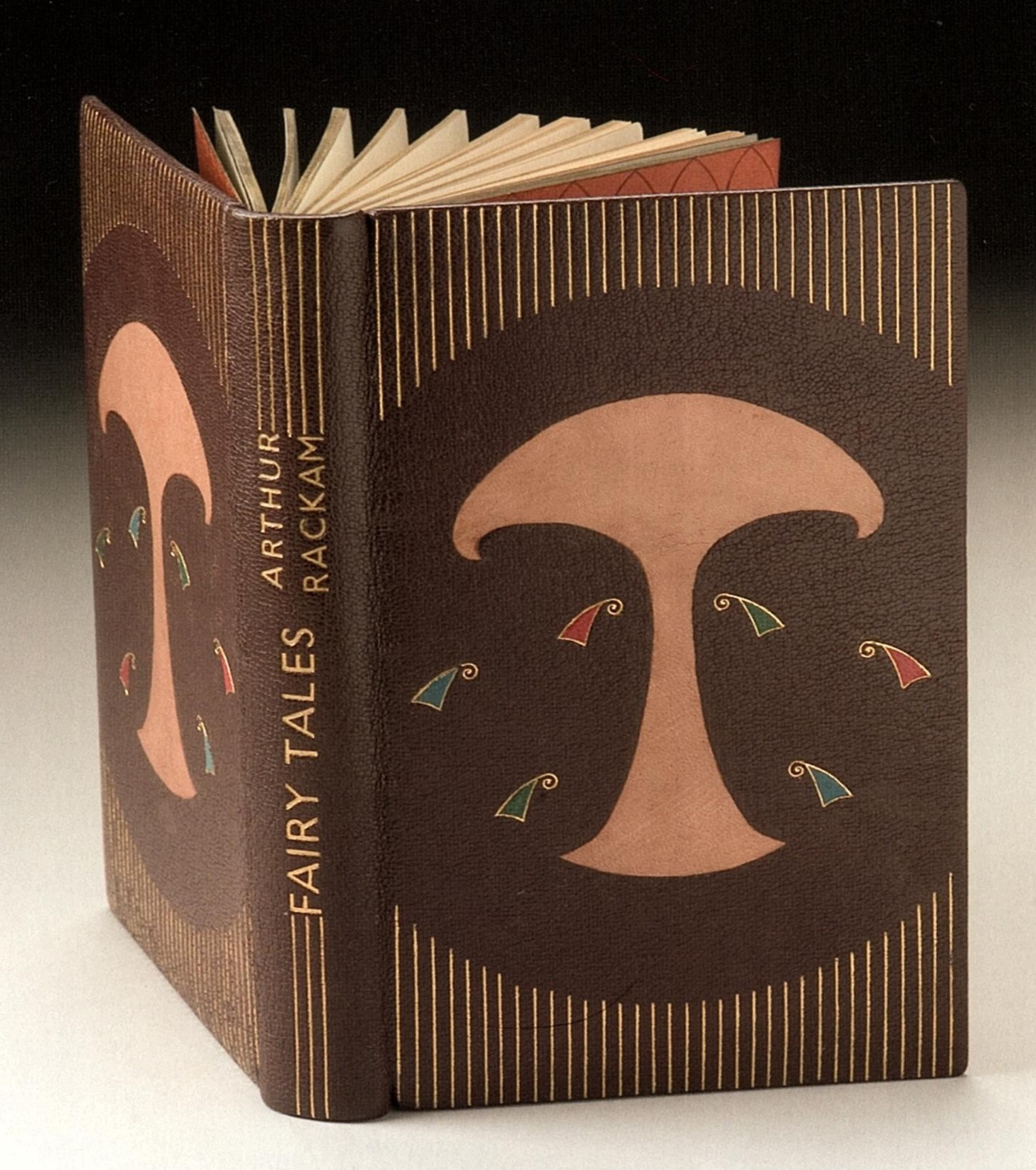

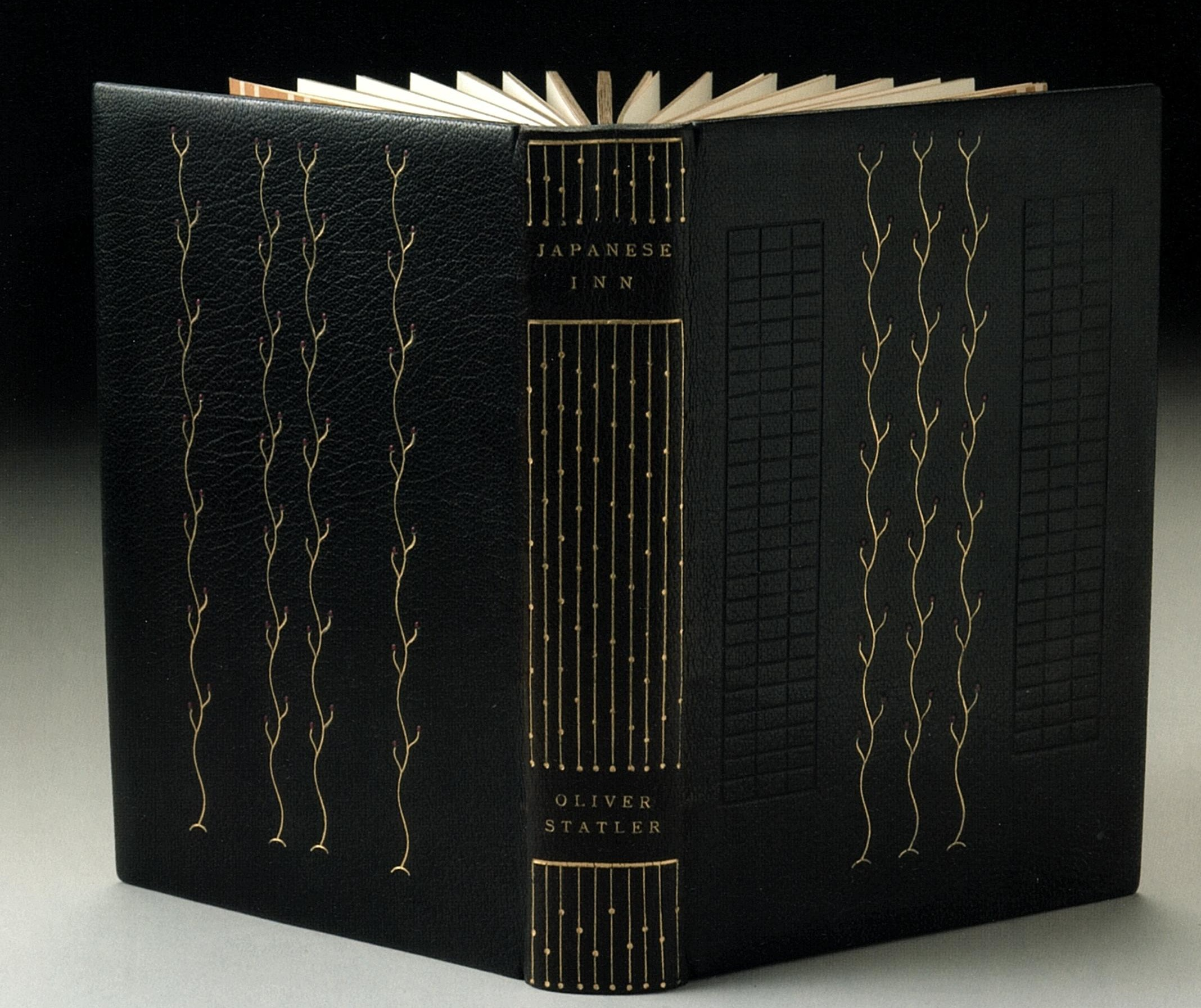

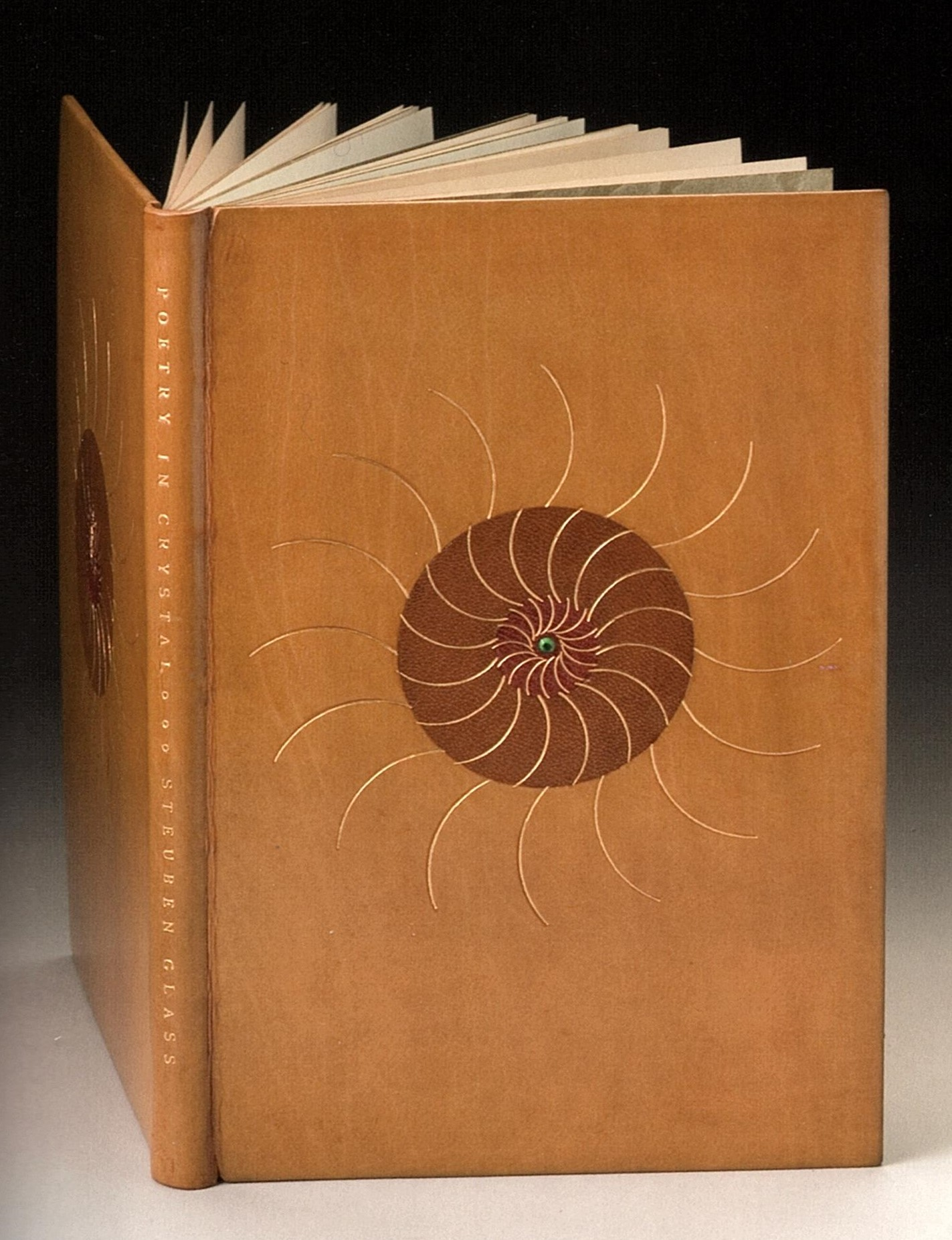

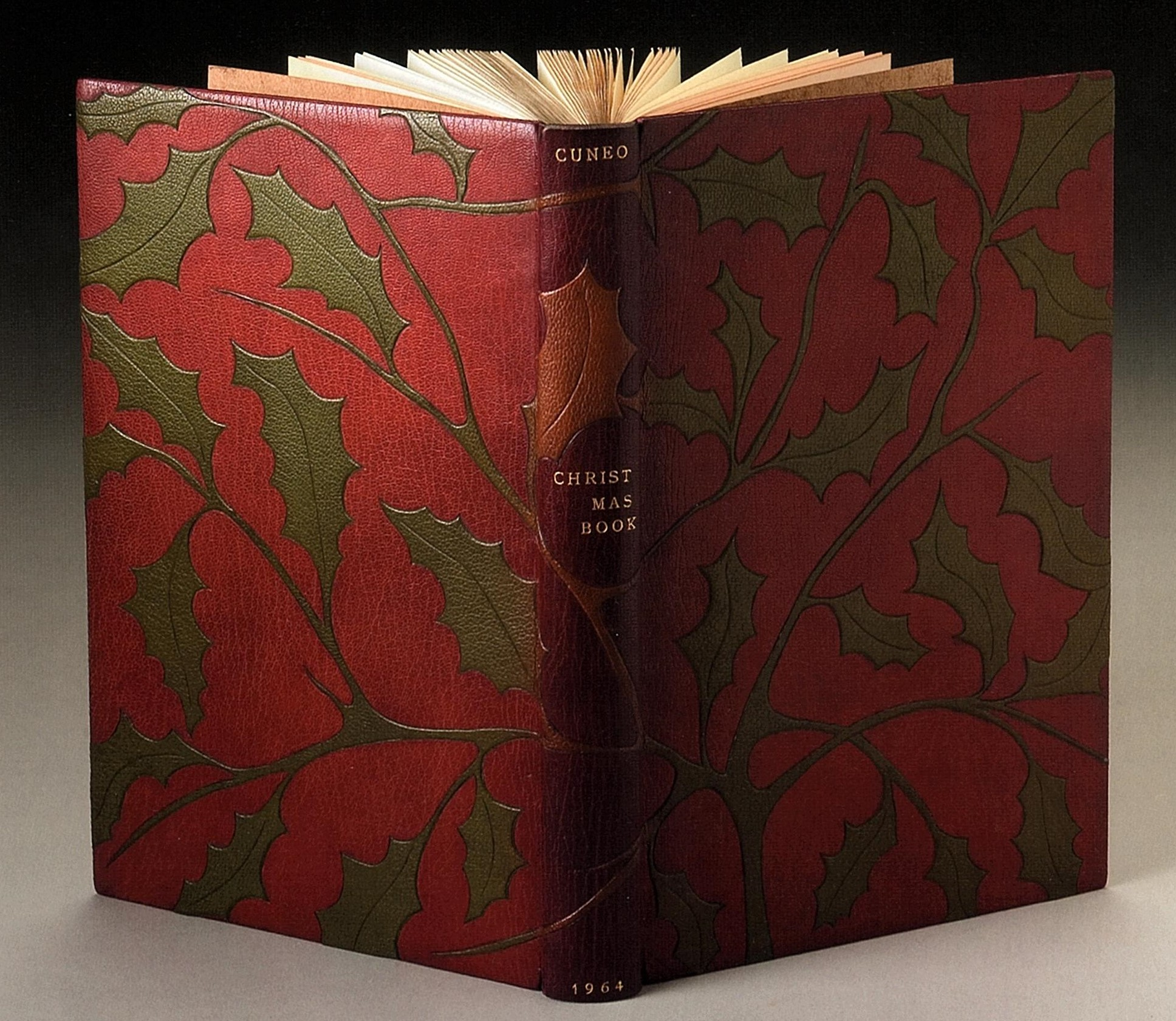

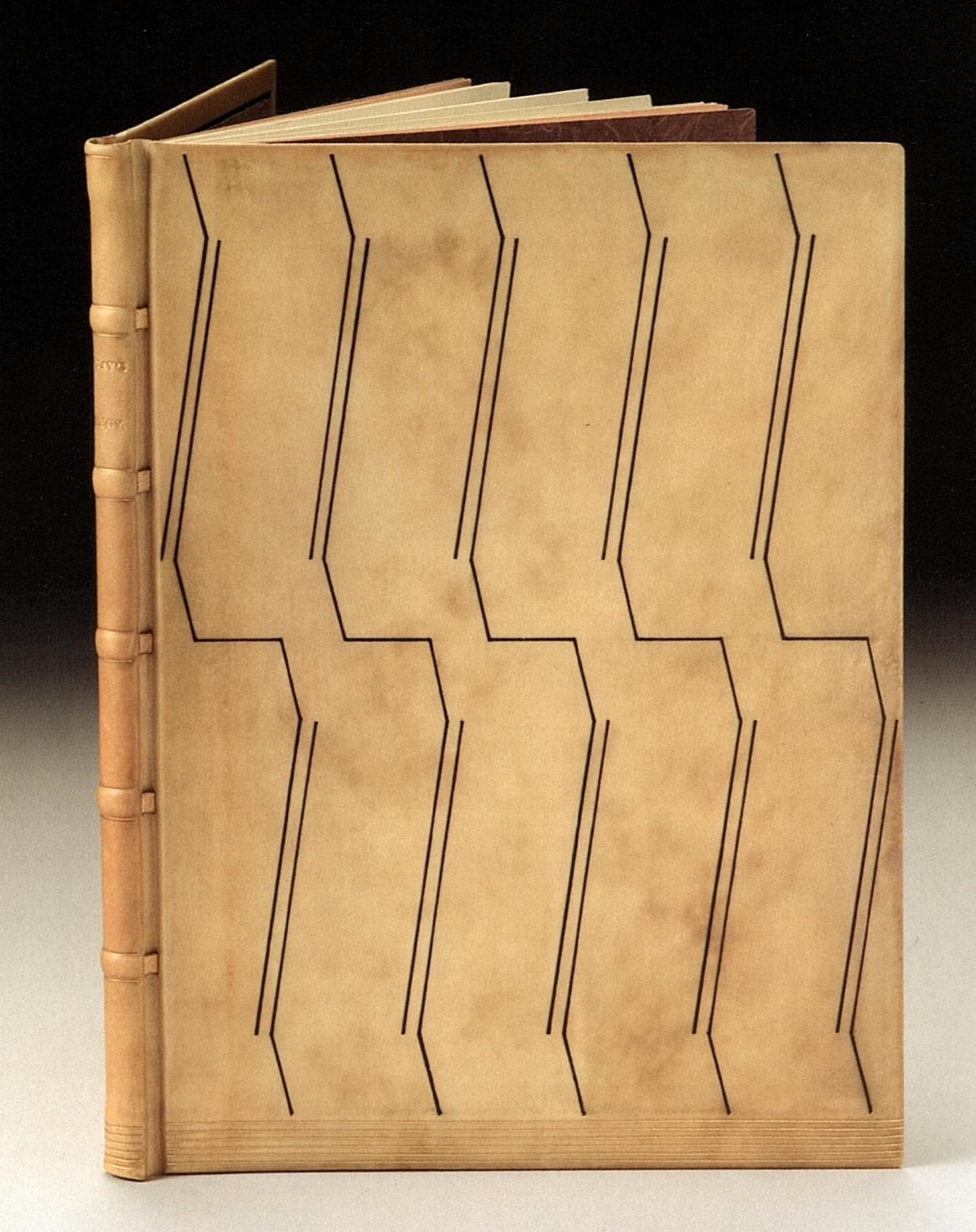

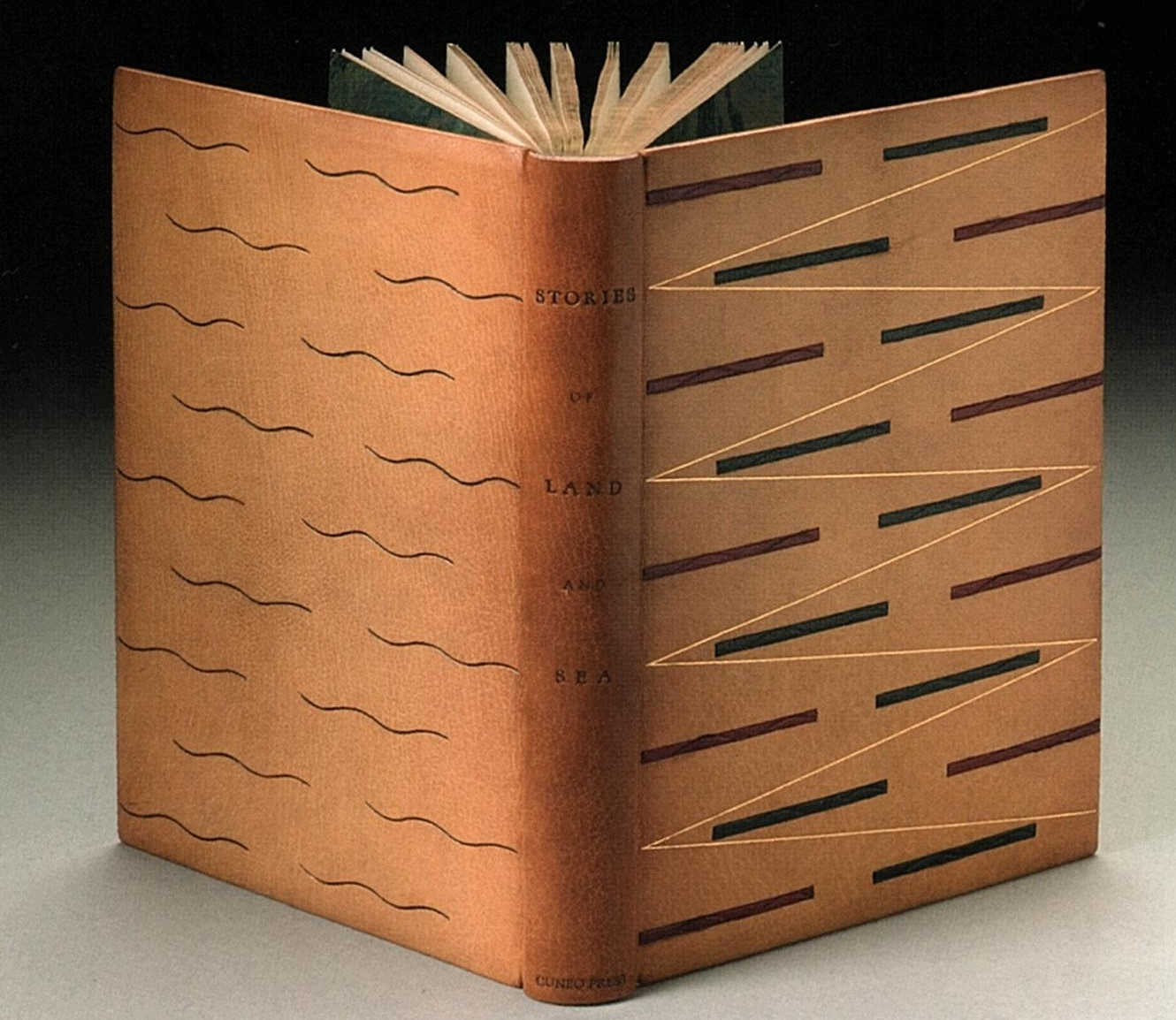

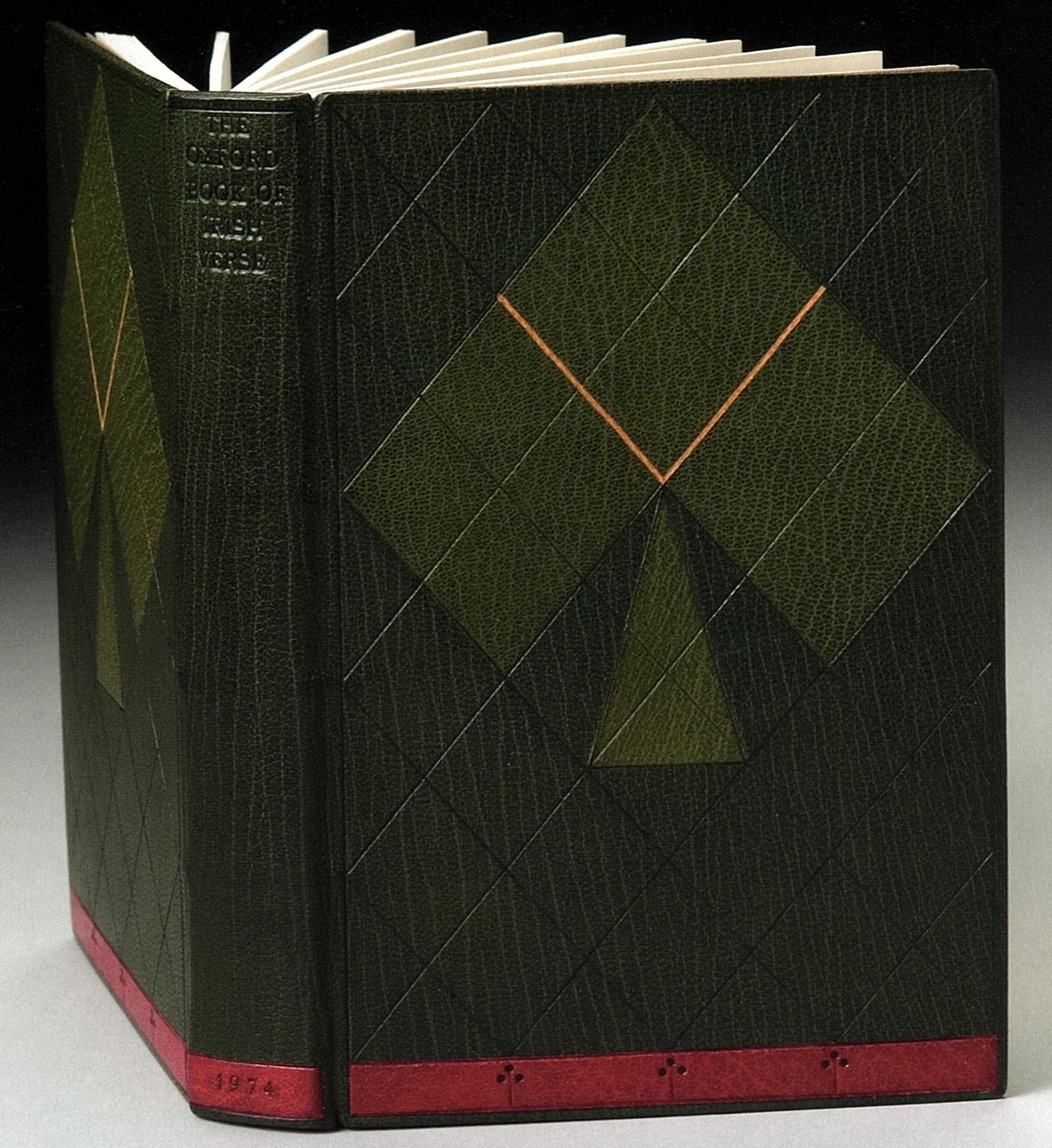

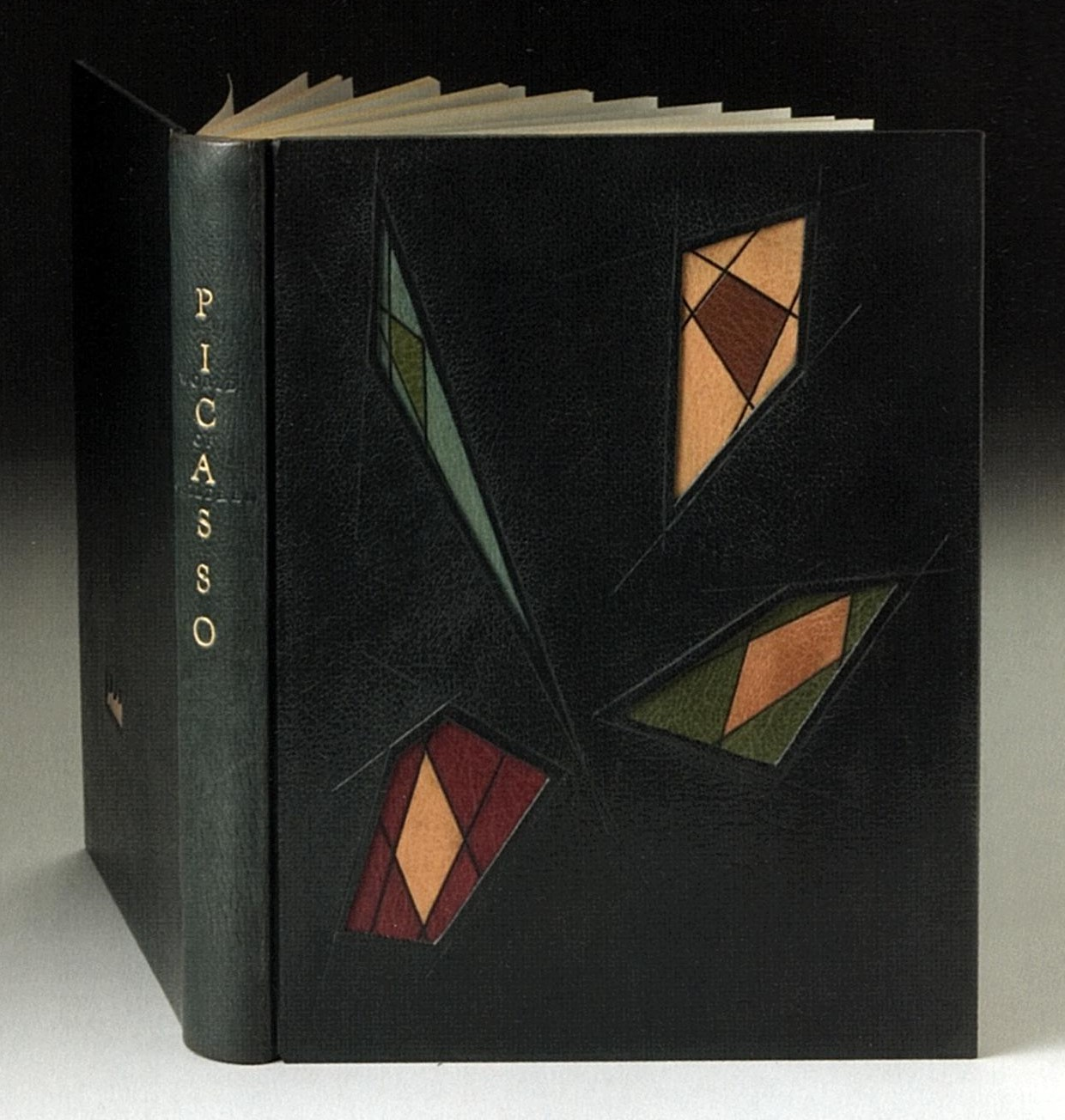

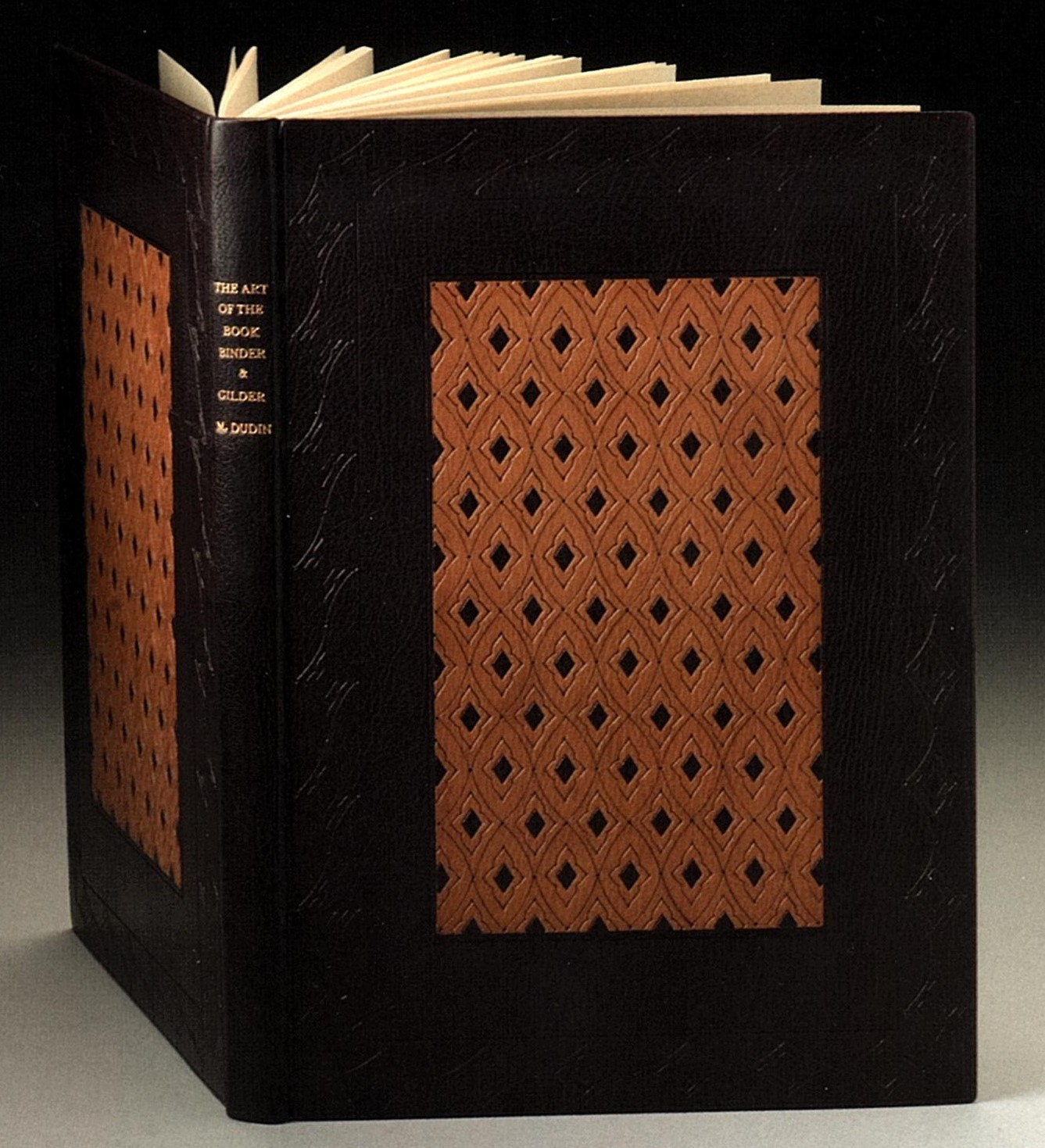

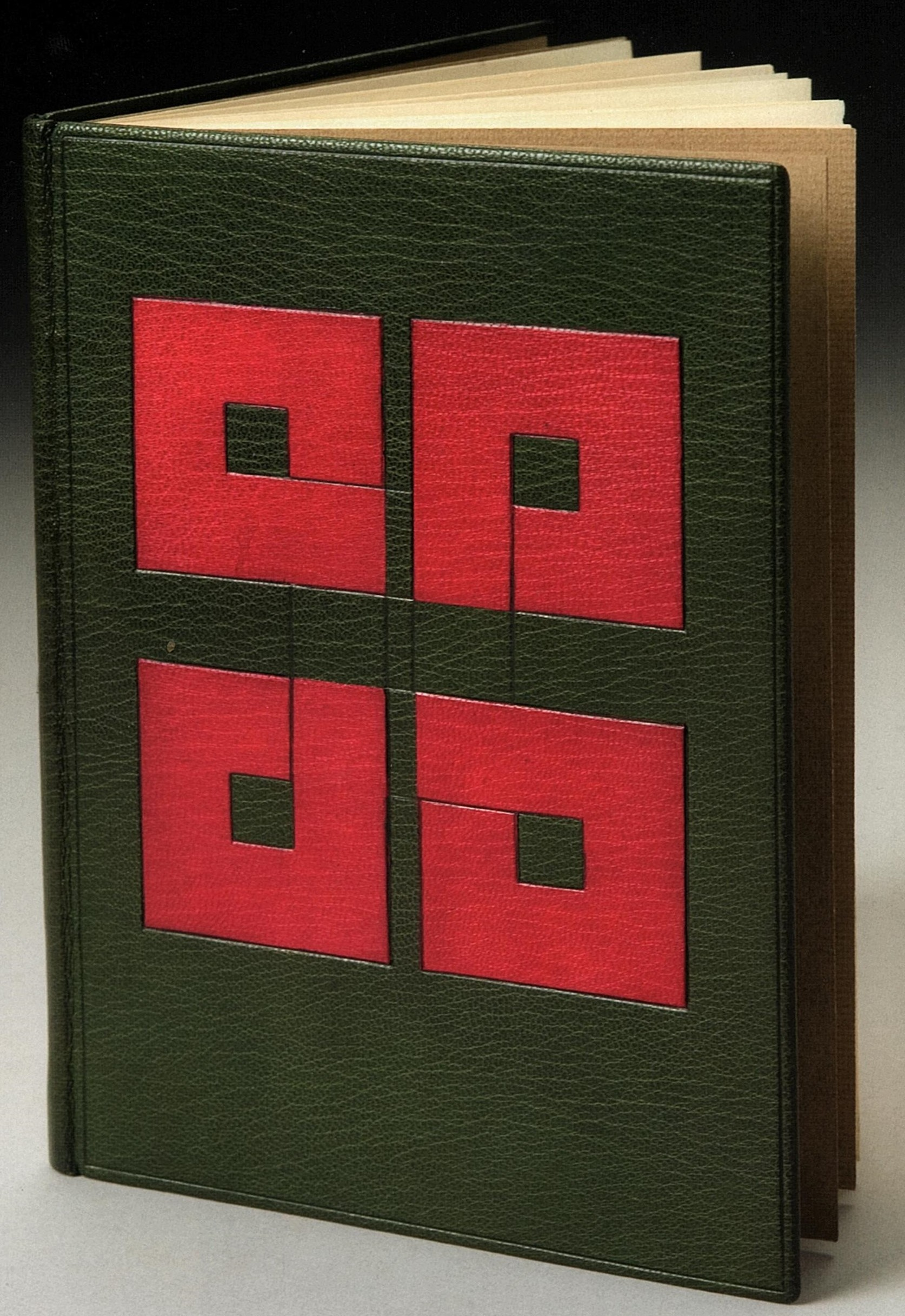

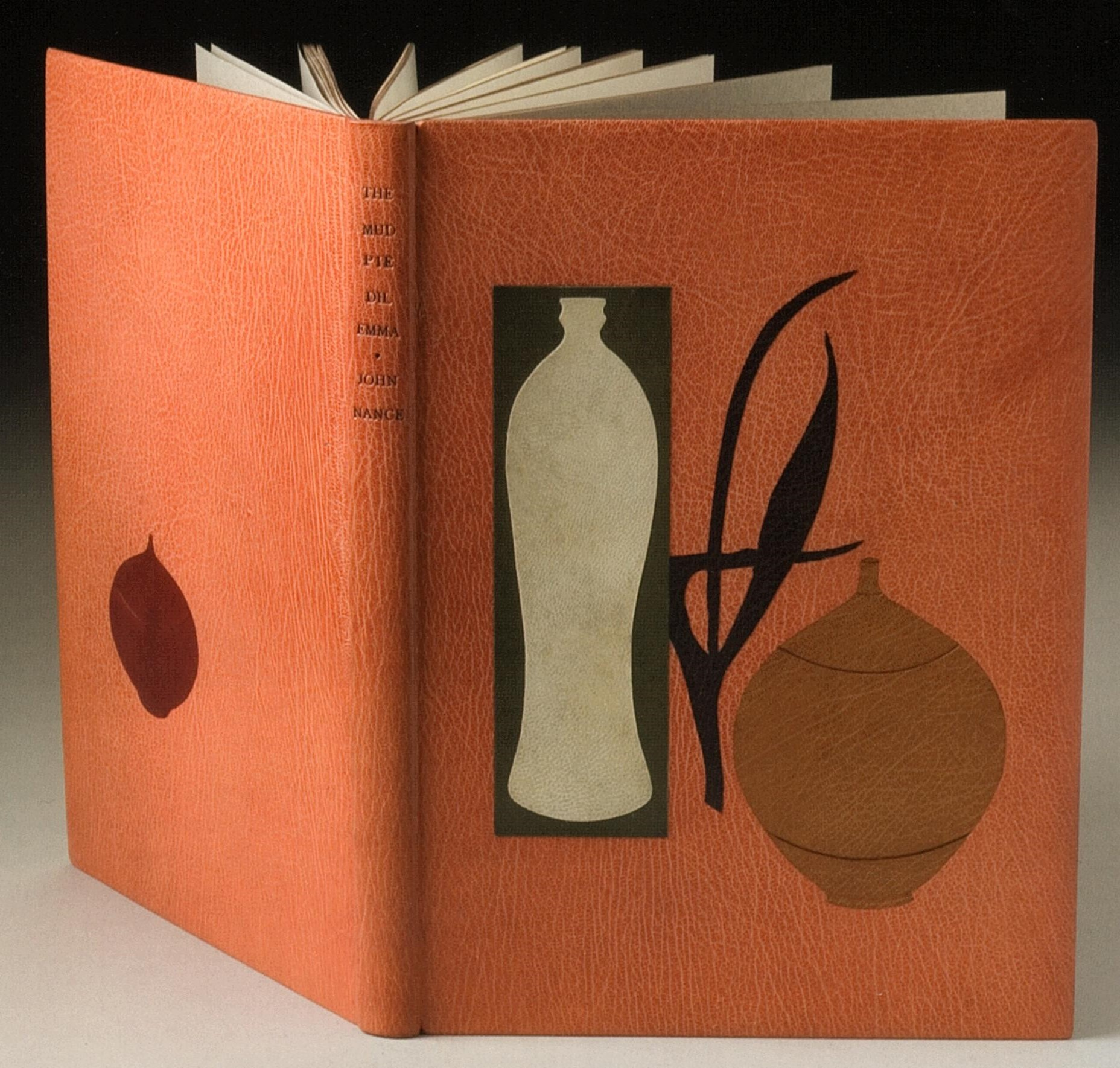

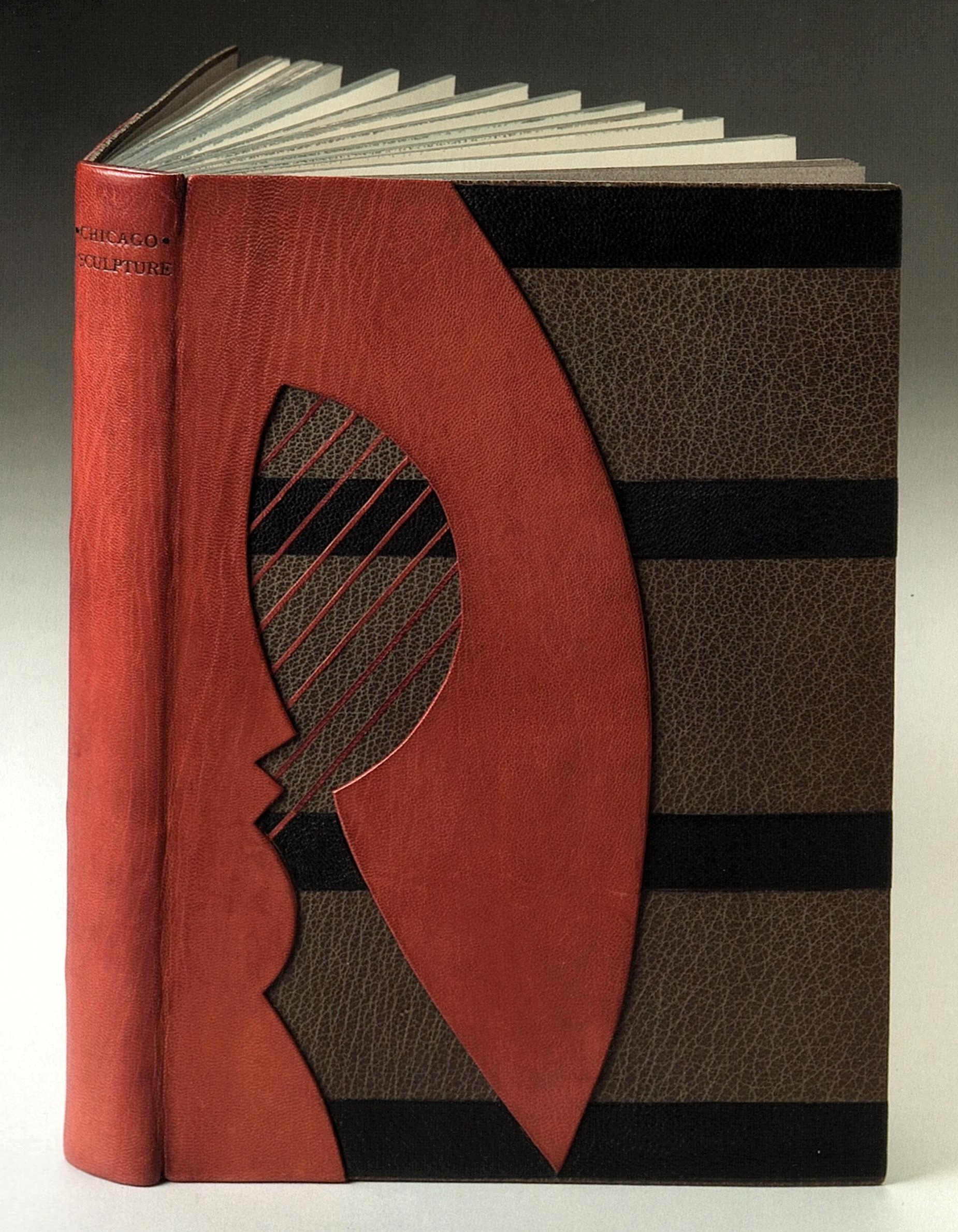

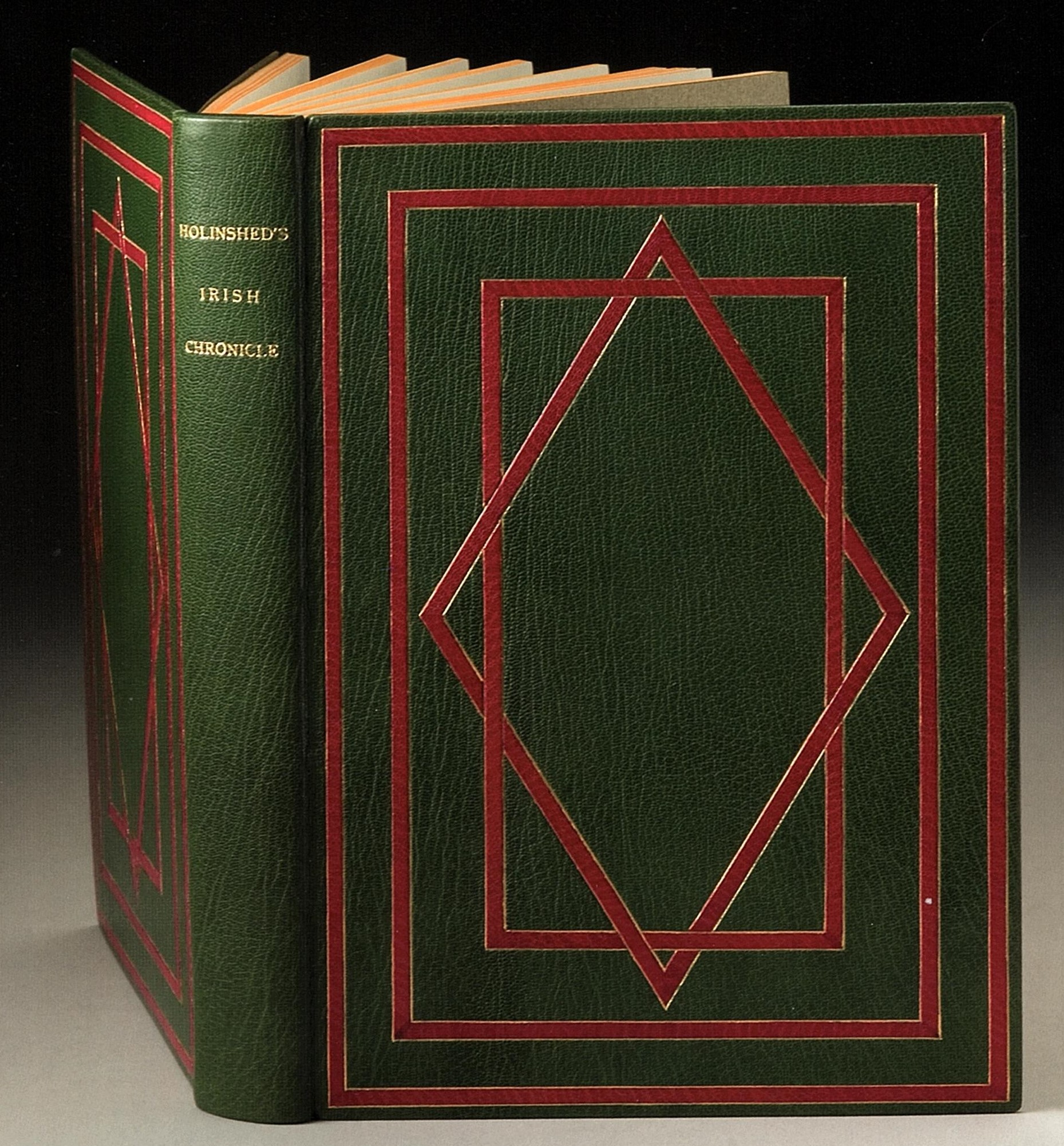

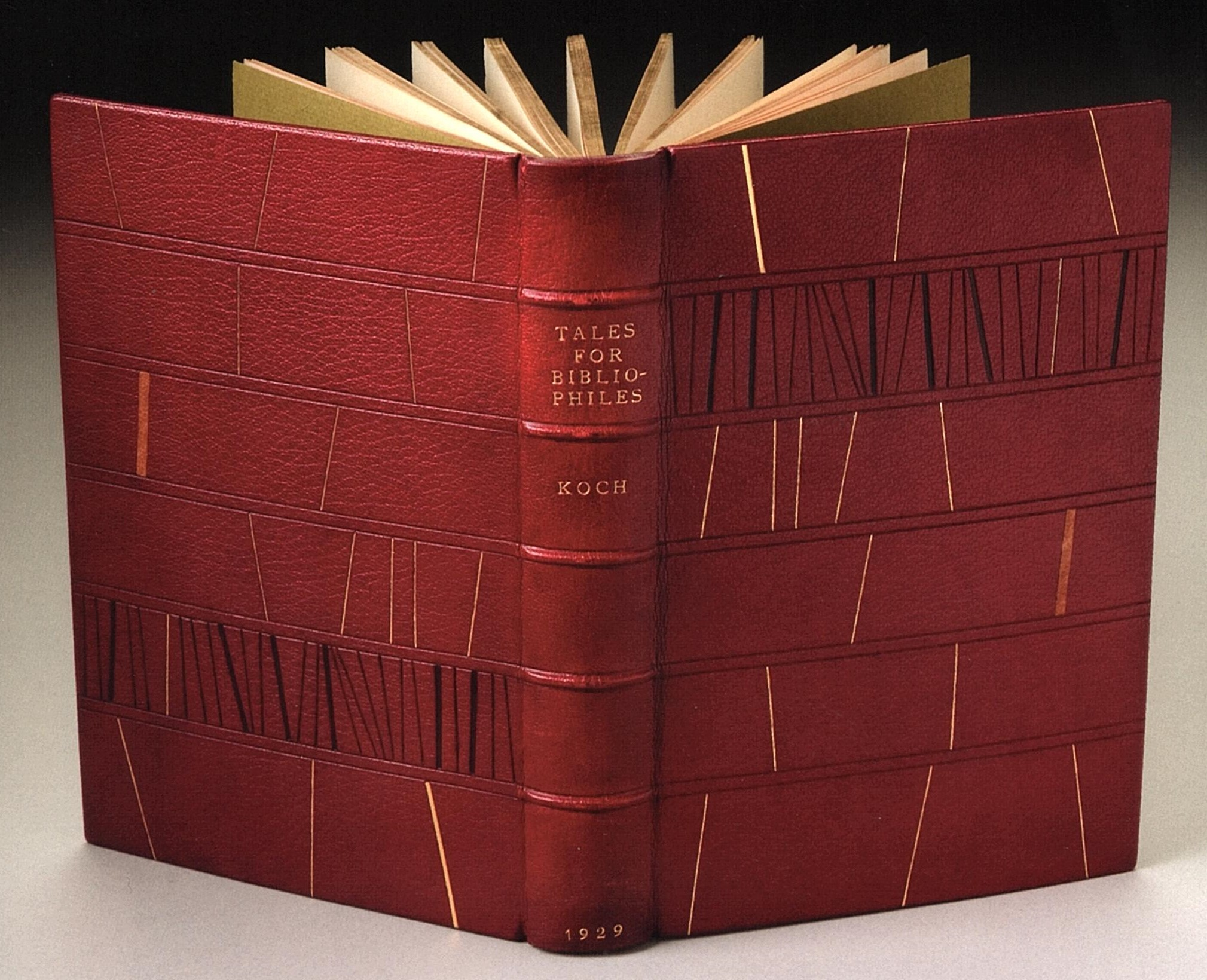

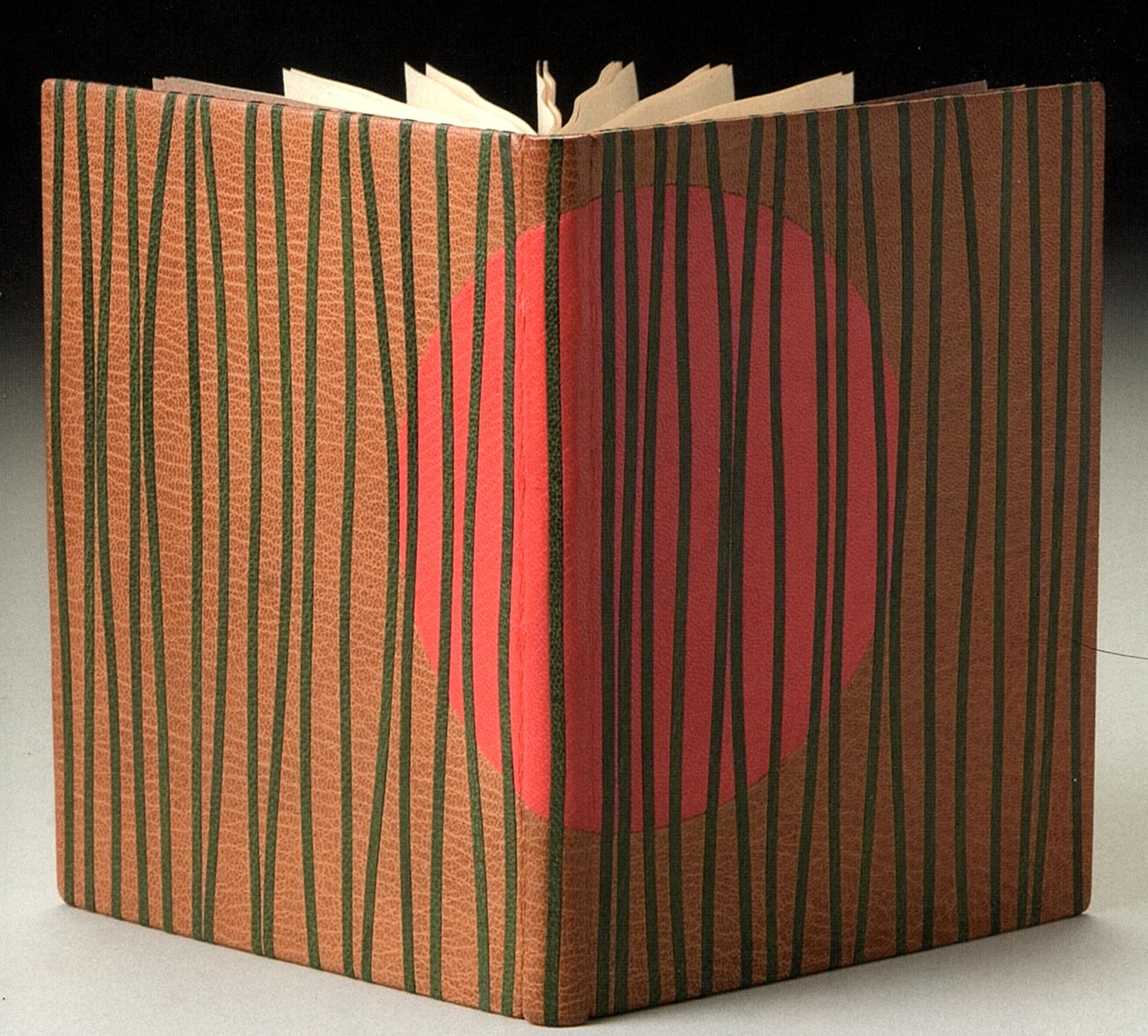

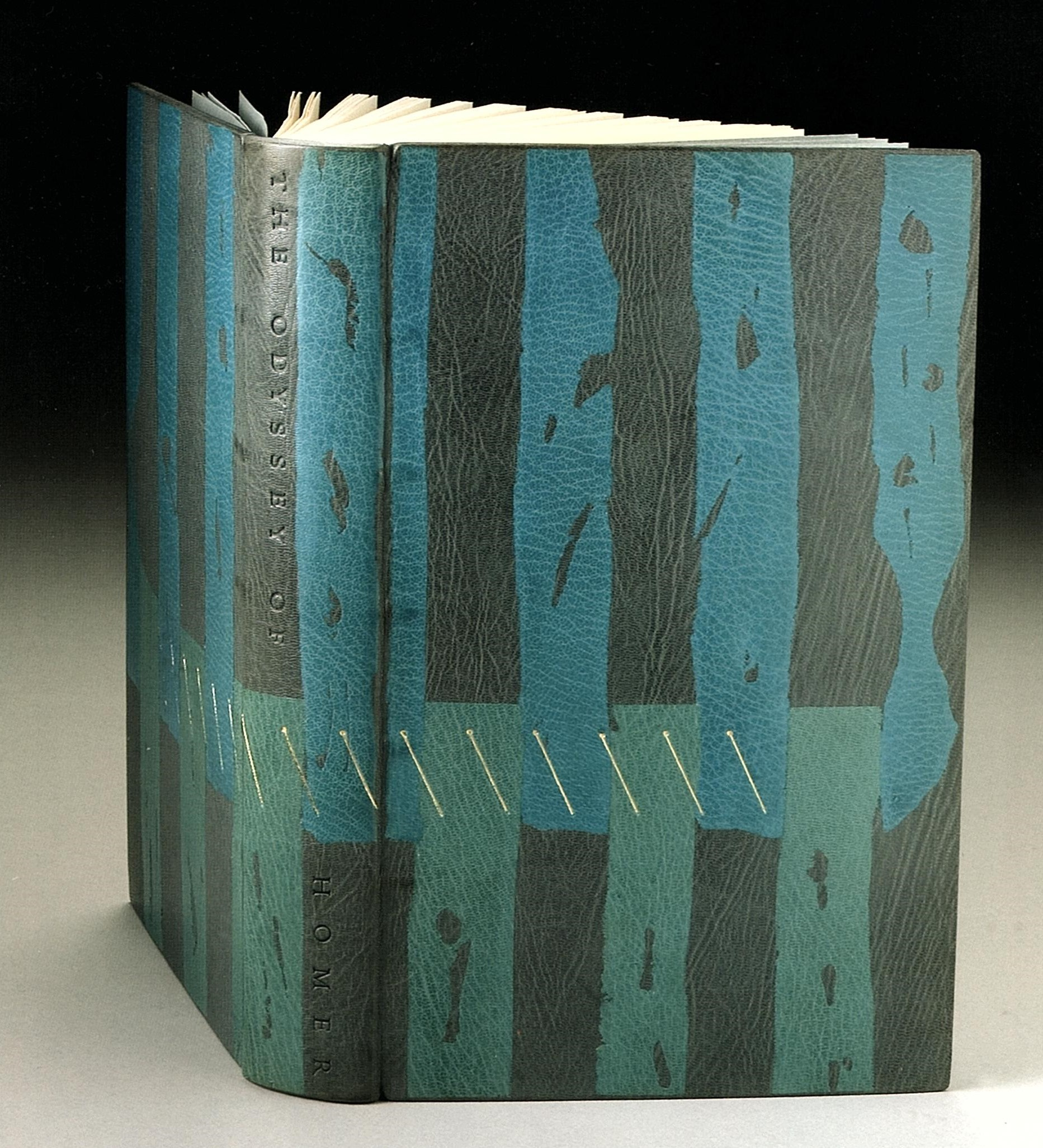

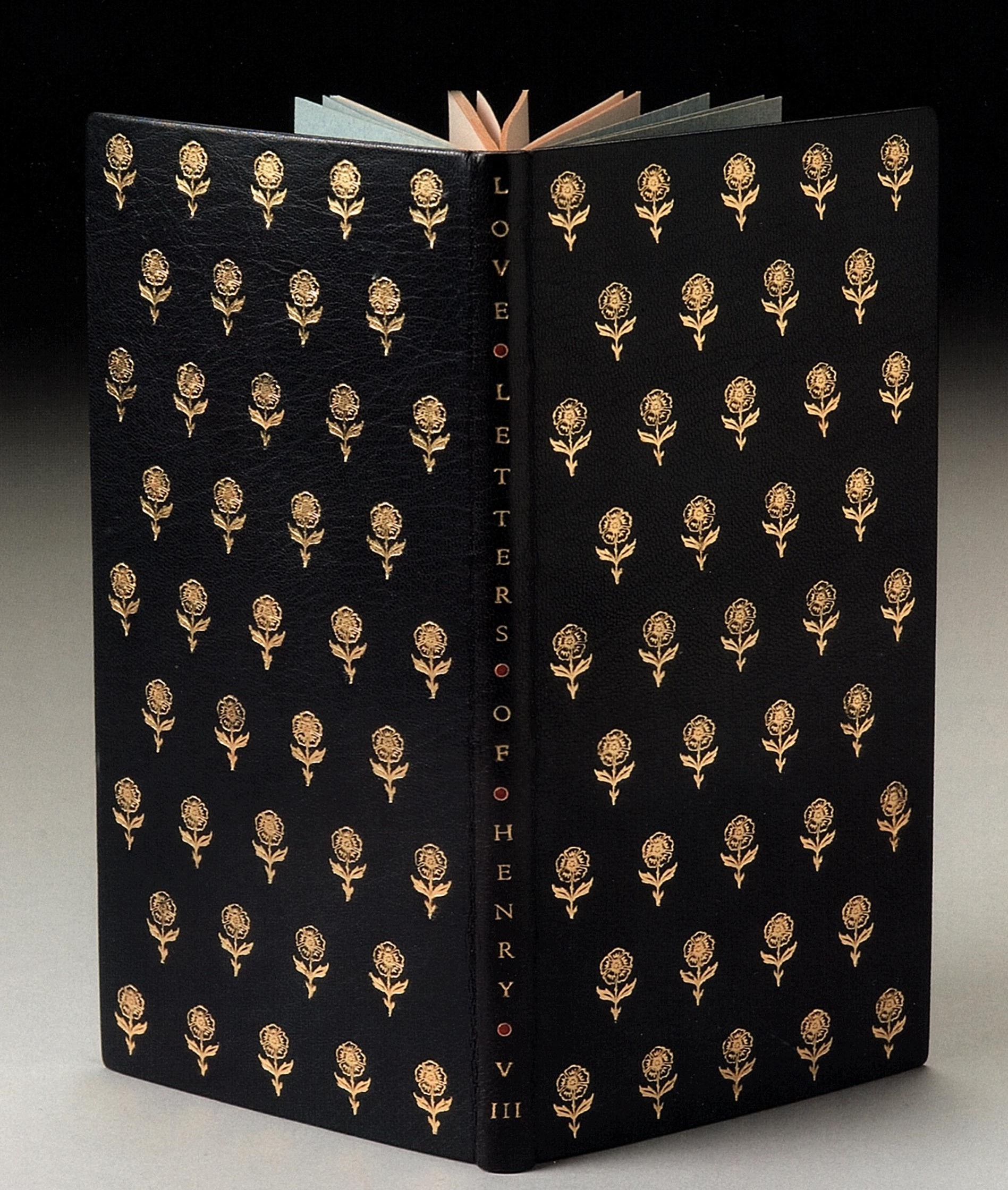
