= George A. Baer =

German/Swiss/American bookbinder (1903–1994)

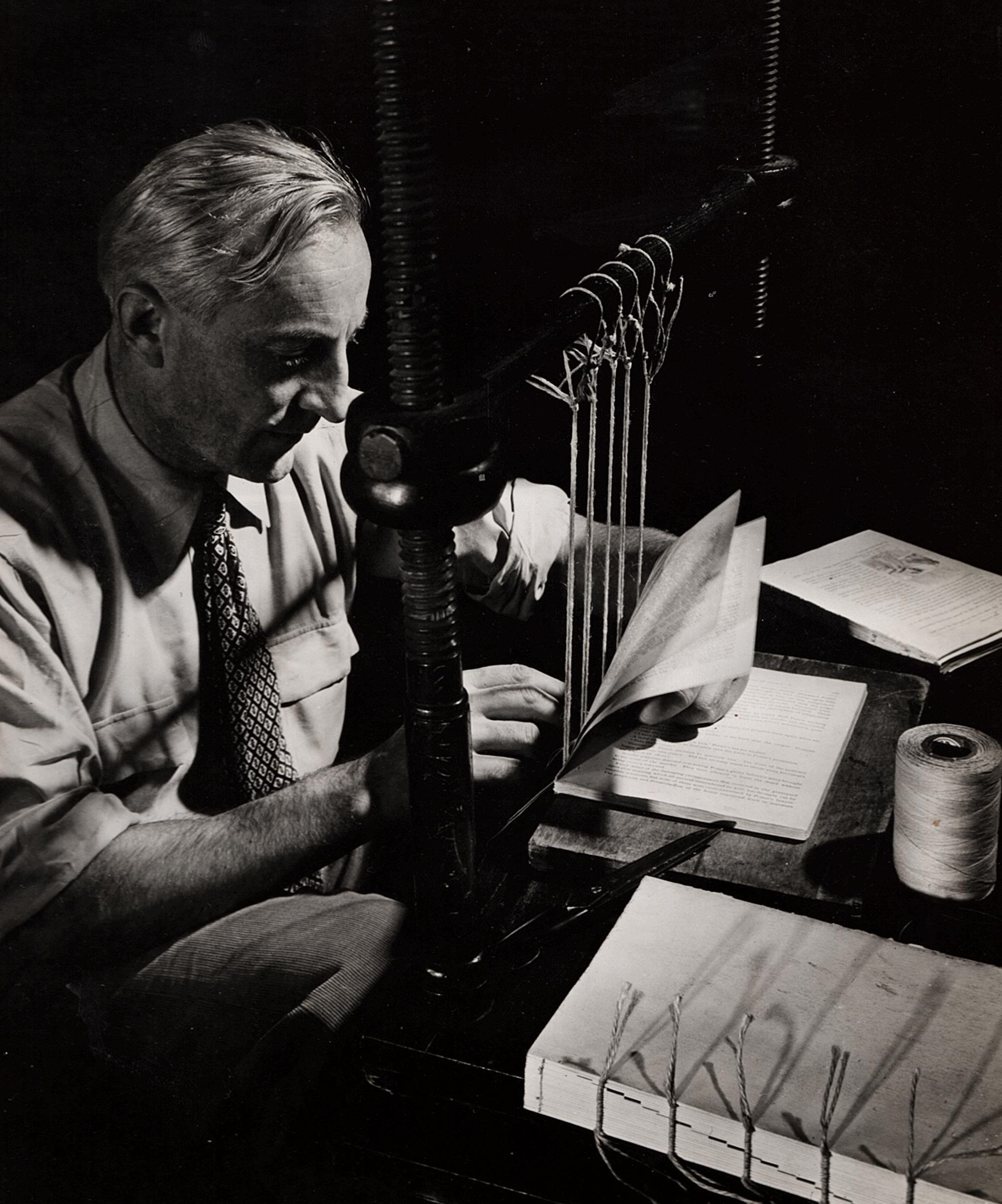
- George Baer, 1960s
- Born: George Adolf Baer; 14 April 1903; Hoboken, New Jersey, United States
- Died: 24 July 1994 (aged 91); Chapel Hill, North Carolina, United States
- Occupation: Master Bookbinder
- Employer(s): Cuneo Press, Chicago
- Spouse: Maly Baer (m. 1933; div. 1959)
- Children: Peter Baer, Tomas Baer, Christian Baer

George A. Baer (April 14, 1903 – July 24, 1994) was a German/Swiss/American bookbinder. He specialized in fine leather bindings, including inlays and gold tooling.

Much of Baer's work involved the restoration of old and rare books for both private customers and numerous rare book libraries around the world. His well-established reputation in this field led to an invitation to help restore books in the Florence, Italy libraries that were water-damaged in the devastating 1966 Flood of the Arno River. Mostly working from his private studios, books bound by him were sold to patrons including Queen Juliana of the Netherlands, the President of France, and Pope Pius XII.

== Early life and training ==
George Adolf Baer was born in Hoboken NJ of German parents, who had immigrated to the US in September, 1902, but returned to Germany shortly after George’s birth. George grew up in Wiesbaden, a German city along the Main River, near Frankfurt. He served a three-year apprenticeship at a book binding company in Wiesbaden from 1919 to 1922. As he recounted in a taped interview,” this was not a fine binding establishment”. It involved strictly binding books with cloth covers. After a year working in a paper making factory and teaching bookbinding at an art school, he decided to pursue fine bookbinding. He was accepted at the Berlin School of Applied Arts under the tutelage of Paul Kersten, one of the foremost bookbinders in Germany. On October 25, 1924, at the age of 21, he received his "Meister Brief für das Buchbinder Handwerk"

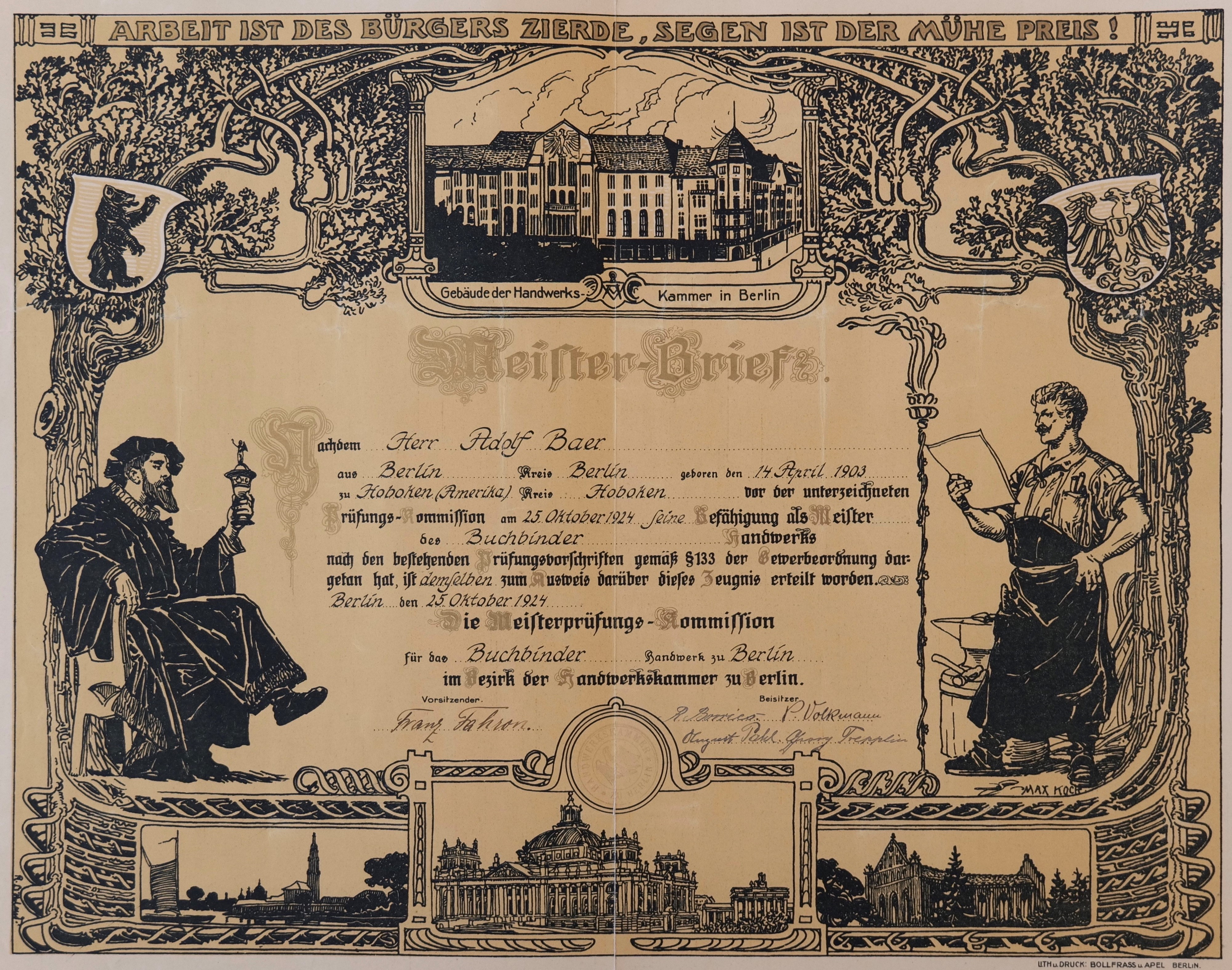

== Teaching career ==
In addition to learning the art of leather binding and gold tooling, Kersten engaged Baer to assist in teaching at the Applied Arts school. In October 1925 Baer was offered his first independent position at the Staatliche Kunstgewerbeschule in Kassel to teach bookbinding. In March 1927, Baer had an offer to set up a bookbinding shop and teach bookbinding at the Vallianios Professional School of Lixouri on the Ionian island of Cephalonia in Greece. This was a French school and all instruction was carried out in French, but he was paid in British pounds (180 pounds per year). He spent 3 ½ years there before returning to Germany in 1931.

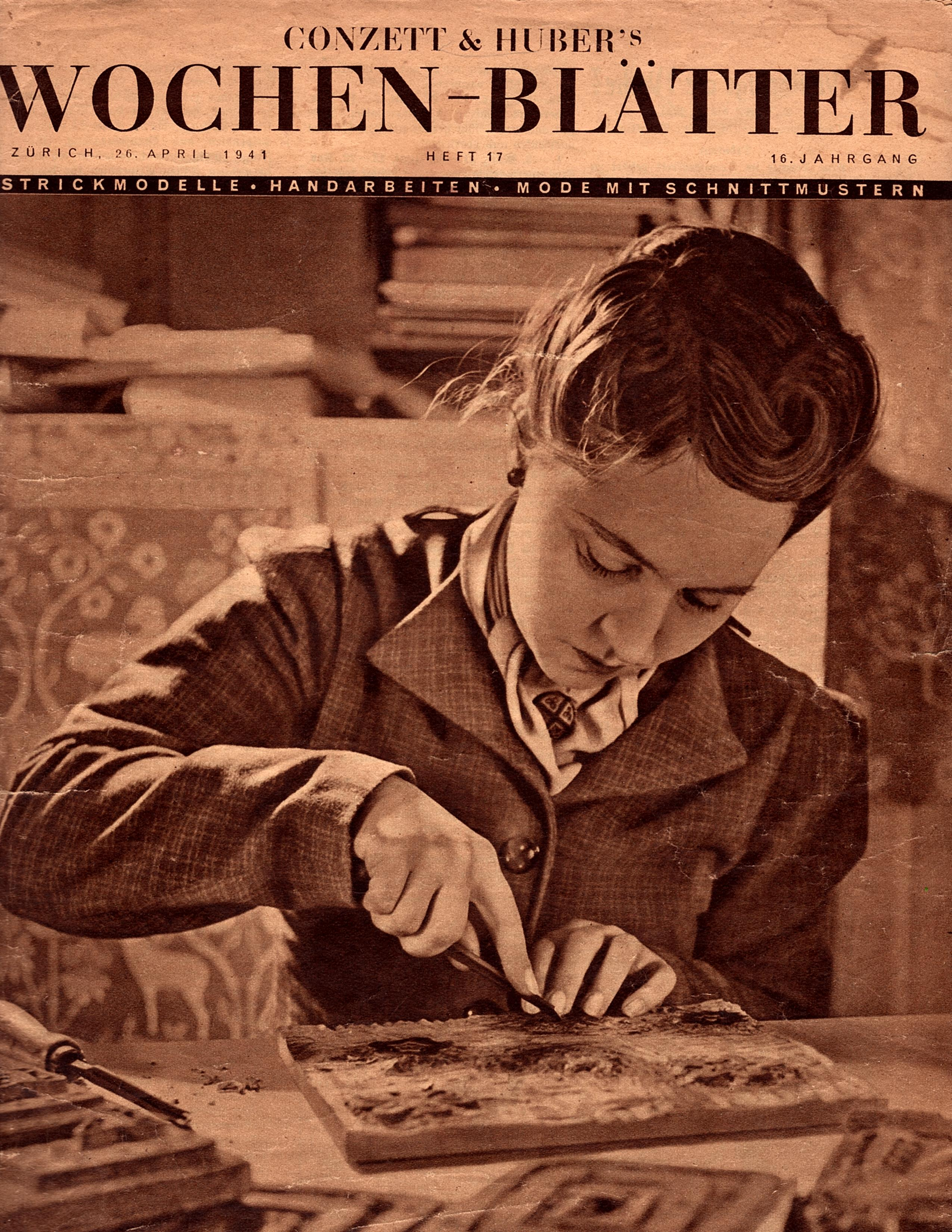

== Life in Switzerland ==
However, by 1931 the Nazi movement in Germany made it difficult for Baer, whose father was Jewish, to find employment. So, he decided to move to Zürich, Switzerland. Within a few years he set up his own shop and married Martha Lena (Maly) Guyer, a Swiss artist at that time specializing in fabric design, primarily curtains for upscale restaurants. During the next 15 years a number of George Baer’s book covers were designed or greatly influenced by Maly.

In 1941 the Baers with their sons bought a farmhouse in Bassersdorf, a small village just outside of Zürich, where they practiced their respective crafts, tended a large garden, and managed a small menagerie of sheep, chickens, and eventually even a cow. After the war several weekly magazines featured this bookbinder/artist/farming family that by all appearances seemed to have found “the happy life”. Among the problems not mentioned in these articles was that Maly, whose Swiss roots go back to Jakob Gujer (also written as Guyer) in the early 1700s, lost her Swiss citizenship because she married a foreigner, and their three Swiss born children also were stateless. As a result, early in the war, the US-born George Baer contacted the US consulate in Zürich to establish his right to US citizenship. In 1949, being unable to resolve the citizenship issue with the Swiss authorities, George Baer decided to move to the US where the rest of the family joined him in 1951.

== Career in the United States ==
Through Baer’s earlier work in restoring ancient Aramaic letters for Ludwig Borchardt, an Egyptologist in Cairo, he made contact with Prof. Keith Seele at the Chicago Oriental Institute who helped him find a position in the fine binding department of the Cuneo Press. Fine binding was a flourishing art at the time in Chicago with such binders as Leonard Mounteney, Alfred de Sauty, Harold Tribolet, Elisabeth Knerr, George Baer and later William Anthony all active. Among these George Baer was particularly noted for his “bold and imaginative covers, with sensitive use of color”. Baer worked at the Cuneo Press fine binding department from 1950 to 1971, as well as in his own workshop binding books for private clients and restoring books for libraries, especially the University of Minnesota Rare Book room.

In 1972 George Baer moved to Chapel Hill, North Carolina, where he continued working from his home, binding and/or restoring books for the University of North Carolina Rare Book room as well as for private clients in the region. In addition, he taught bookbinding for several years through the UNC evening college. When George Baer finally retired a second time at the age of 81, he donated his collection of fine bindings and other documents to the University of North Carolina at Chapel Hill Library. The books are now housed in the Rare Book Room as part of the George Baer Collection of Bookbinding (see link in the External Links section).

== As an artist ==
When Baer first studied fine bookbinding in the early 1920s with Paul Kersten in Berlin, the decorative designs on books were traditional and often very ornate. But, just at this time German art and applied art were being transformed by the Bauhaus movement initiated by the architect, Walter Gropius. This group of artists stressed the merger of function and art as well as simplicity of design. It became Baer’s guiding principle in binding and decorating books. As he pointed out in a taped interview in 1986, Baer said that a book, first of all, has to be well constructed and should be bound so that it can be read – “a well-bound book should last 100 to 200 years”. For this reason Baer did not like the “French method of book binding because they shaved the leather too thin” to make them elegant but at the expense of a considerably shorter life span for the binding. In addition, Baer adopted simple and clean modern designs that were inspired by the book’s content. “When I was a student I was told a bookbinder should never read books, otherwise he would not make a living.“ But early on he began his work “by reading the book and getting a feeling for the design, type and colors” and then he reflected, “sometimes for months”, until he got the idea for the book cover design.

Among the books in the George Baer Collection of Bookbinding (Rare Book Collection, Louis Round Wilson Special Collections Library, University of North Carolina at Chapel Hill) are four books that Baer bound during his years in Greece. These bindings nicely illustrate Baer's attempt to match the decorations with the books' contents. In Franz Spunda's Der Heilige Berg Athos (The holy Mount Athos is located in northeastern Greece) Baer chose to decorate the cover with Greek letters, most of them used just as decorations. But in the center of the cross, the letters ΙΣ ΧΣ (short hand for Jesus Christ) and NIKA (victorious or victory) are ones that frequently appear in Greek Orthodox Iconography. They symbolize that Christ is victorious. In Spyridon Loverdos's book Ho mētropolitēs Smyrnēs Chrysostomos, which describes the life and death of Chrysostomos, the Greek Orthodox bishop of Smyrna during the Turkish Greek War in 1922, Baer decorated the cover with the Double-Headed Eagle, which is of Byzantine origin and was the flag of the Holy Roman Empire from 1400-1800. The small Greek orthodox bible New Testament of our Lord and Saviour Jesus Christ, which measures just 5"x3" is bound in red Moroccan Goat leather. It is decorated with the title in classic Greek letters, thus serving as both the book title as well as its decoration. The final book from the Greek period is Vierzig Jahre auf dem Wasser (Forty years on the Water) by Otto Protzen. It is an account of Protzen's boating experiences with paddle as well as sail boats, mostly in northern Germany but also across the Atlantic to the Massachusetts coast. The figure on the blue leather binding is a Greek galley (a trireme), which seems out of place for a German book dealing with modern sailing in the North Sea. However, Baer had fallen in love with Greece, and followed his whims.

The period after Baer's marriage to Maly (Guyer) Baer in 1933, the book covers changed in style, becoming less formal and more expressive. During the 25 years of their marriage, many designs were created or inspired by Maly Baer. Good examples are Angels over the Altar: Christian folk Art in Hawaii and the South Seas (bound in natural Niger goatskin with blue and red leather inlays); and The kind of World Americans Want (bound in Oasis leather and gold and blind tooled by hand). In Audubon's The Birds of America bound some years after the divorce, the book's spine clearly shows Maly's style, while the front and back covers are more reminiscent of George Baer's style. The Photo Album for Susan was also created well after the divorce. The rose on the cover was probably not designed by Maly, but Baer found a design that he liked and incorporated that with inlaid leather into the cover.

The analytical bible published in 1964 and bound sometime after that has a stark and powerful cover with the crown of thorns on the wooden cross lying in a pool of blood. Equally stark is the title, consisting of just THE BIBLE (not THE HOLY BIBLE), which may be an oversight, or an expression of Baer's strong atheism. The next three photos show a 2 Volume set of Anthropological Essays edited by Yehudi A. Cohen (1968) entitled Man in Adaption, The Cultural Present (Vol 1) and The Biosocial Background (Vol 2). Baer chose to inlay a photo of the Giacometti sculpture, The Chariot, for Volume 1, and a photo of a possibly modern or perhaps ancient pregnant woman. Das Lied des Friedens (The Song of Peace) by Albius Tibullus, a Roman poet is an elegy written in Latin with the German translation. It is bound in natural Niger leather and blind tooled. The design evokes the peace of the agricultural countryside. The little bee near the bottom right was not part of the original design but was added to cover up an error in stamping. Baer used this book frequently to emphasize that occasional mistakes are inevitable, but that with care and imagination, they can be fixed up. Baer chose to use a hand printed paper on the inside cover with more blind tooling around the leather edge. In the mid sixties, Baer designed and bound a colorful book for Rev. Ralph Sockman on behalf of the Church Peace Union, of which Sockman was president. The design incorporates the Christian cross in a simple and abstract style. The colors of the inlaid leather represent all races of mankind, and the word PAX suggests the basic purpose of the Church Peace Union.

Each year, the Cuneo Press, where George Baer led the fine binding department, requested the production of about 100 Christmas Books to give to their valued customers. Most of these were half leather, but Baer chose to make one, Christmas over the Centuries in full leather for use in exhibitions. This is an example from the early 1960s. The stylized Greek letters, alpha and omega, suggest the beginning and the end. Also note the shepherd's staff on the spine.

== Exhibitions ==
- Exposition Internationale des Arts et des Techniques, Paris (1937)
- Swiss Landesaustellung, Zurich (1939)
- Traveling Exhibitions in Germany and Sweden (1959)
- Chicago Public Library (1961)
- Kalamazoo Institute of Arts (1962)
- John Crerar Library, then at the Illinois Institute of Technology, Chicago (1965)
- Milwaukee Public Library (1967)

== Selected bound books ==
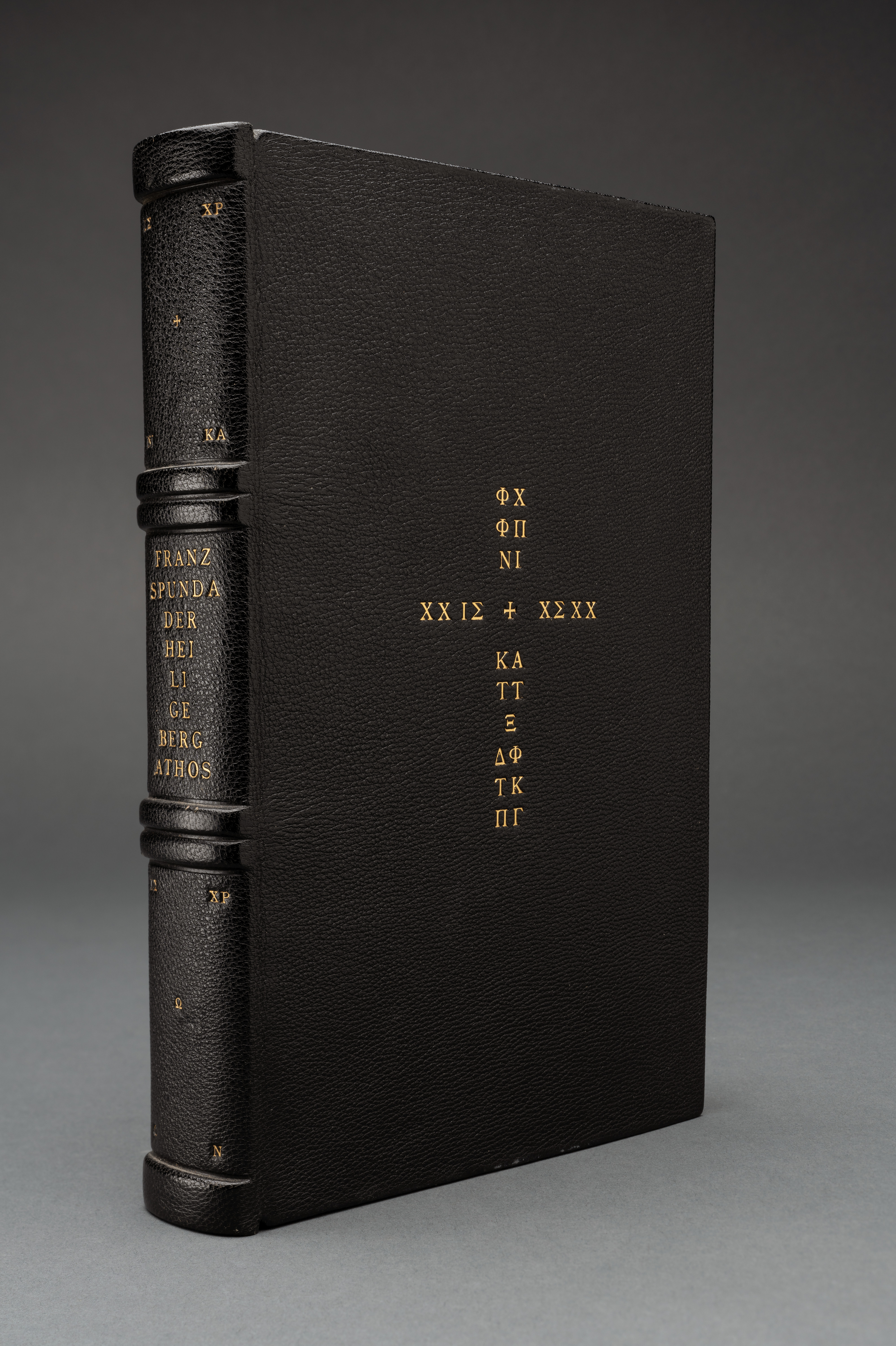

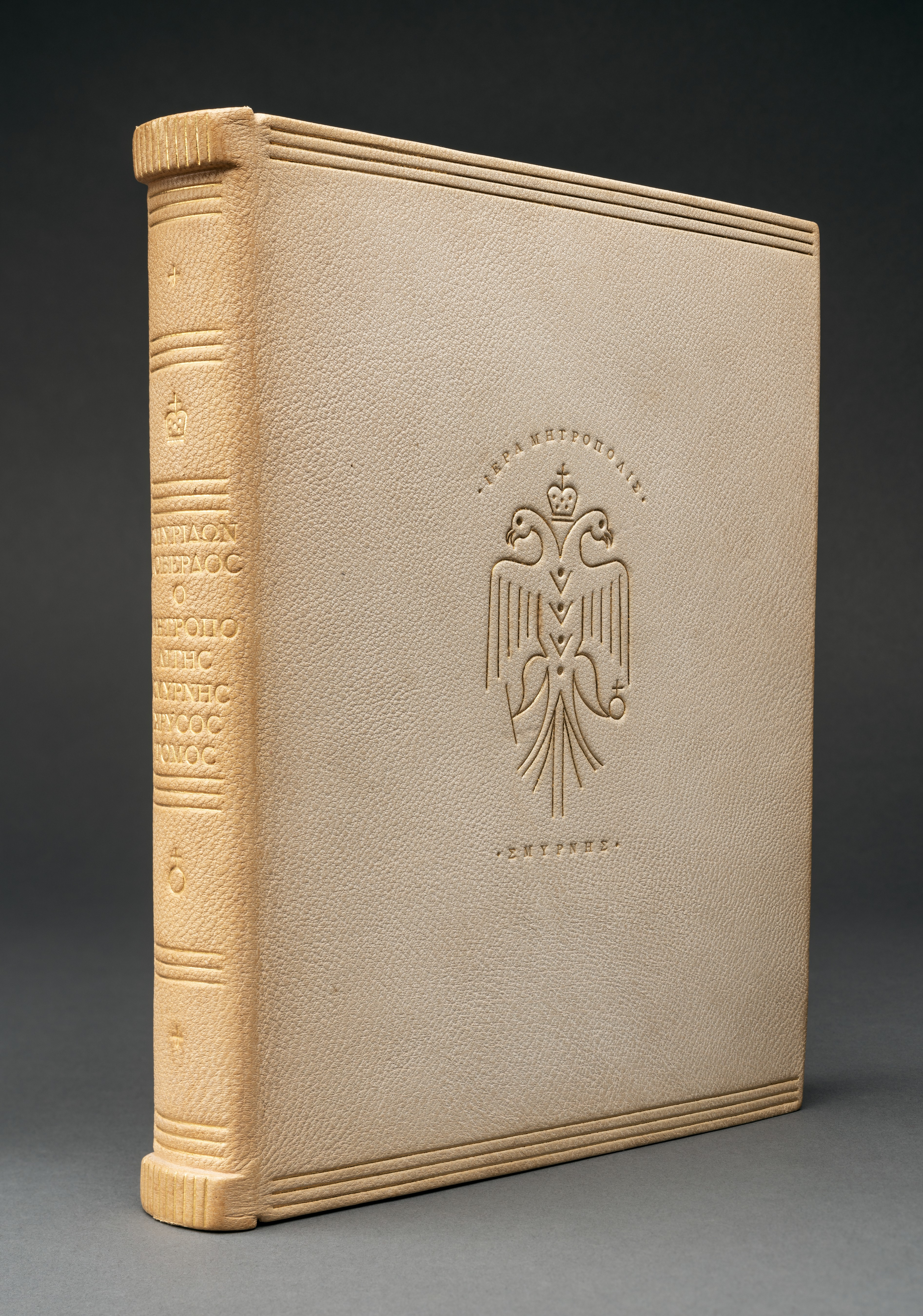

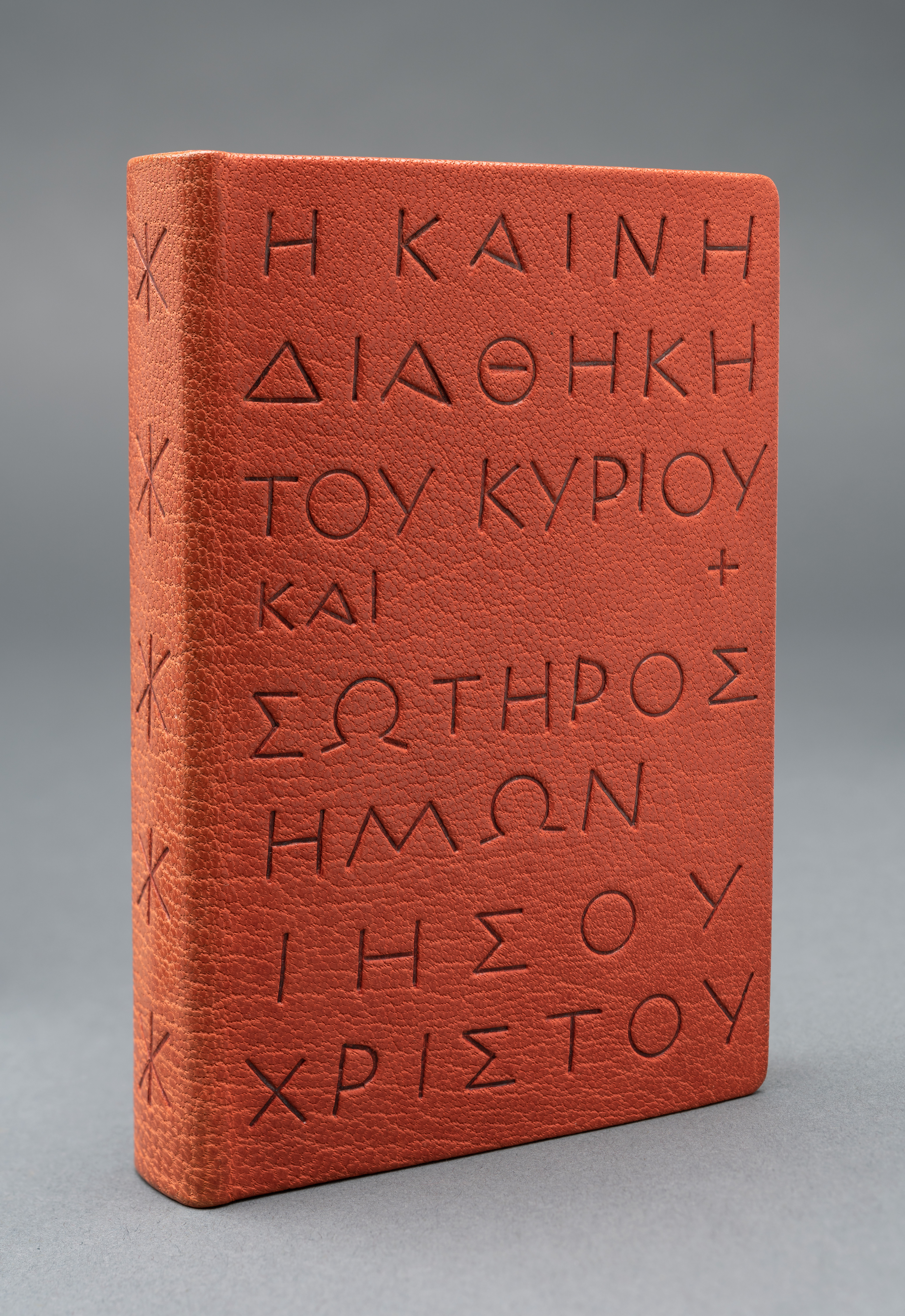

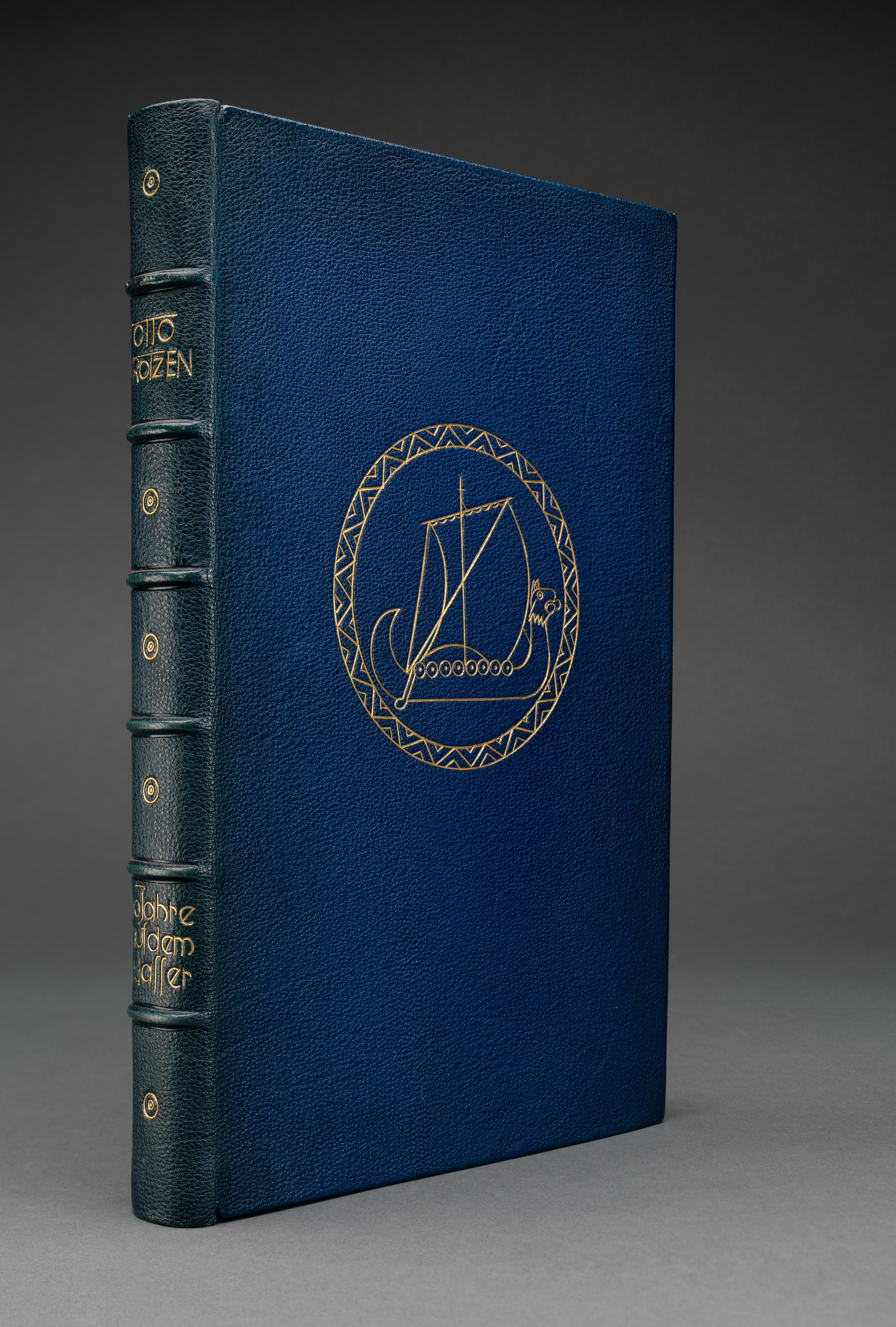

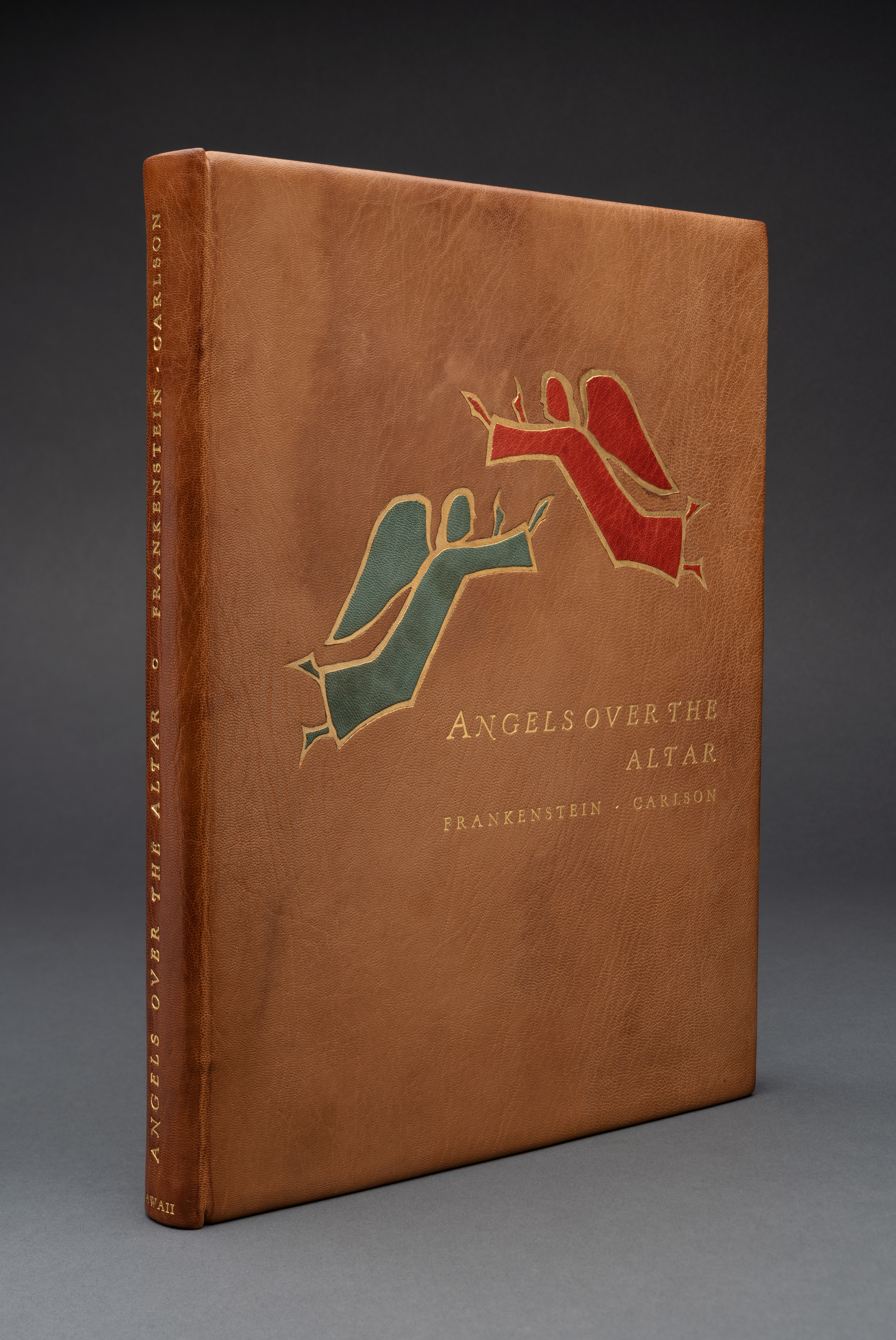

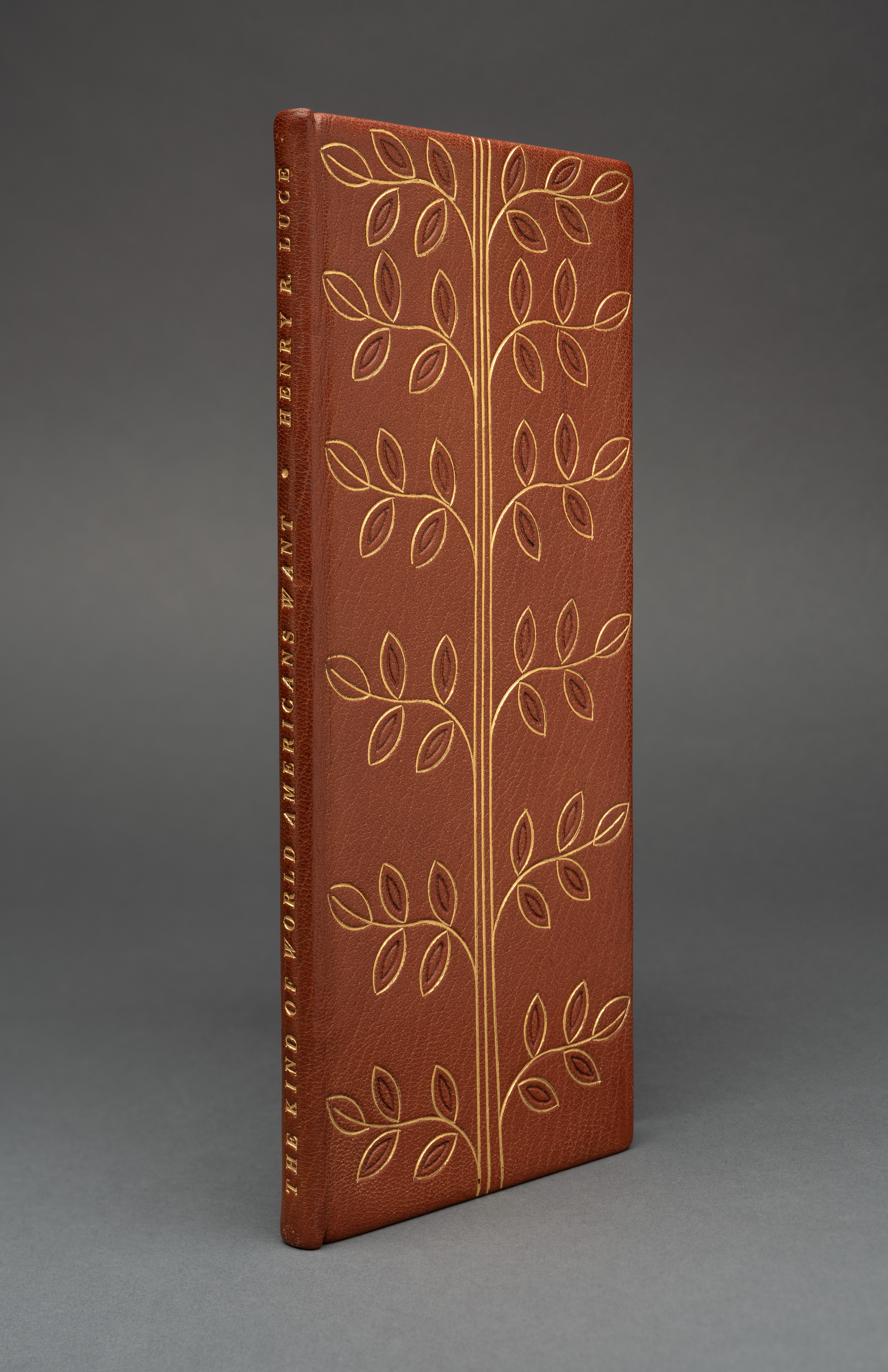

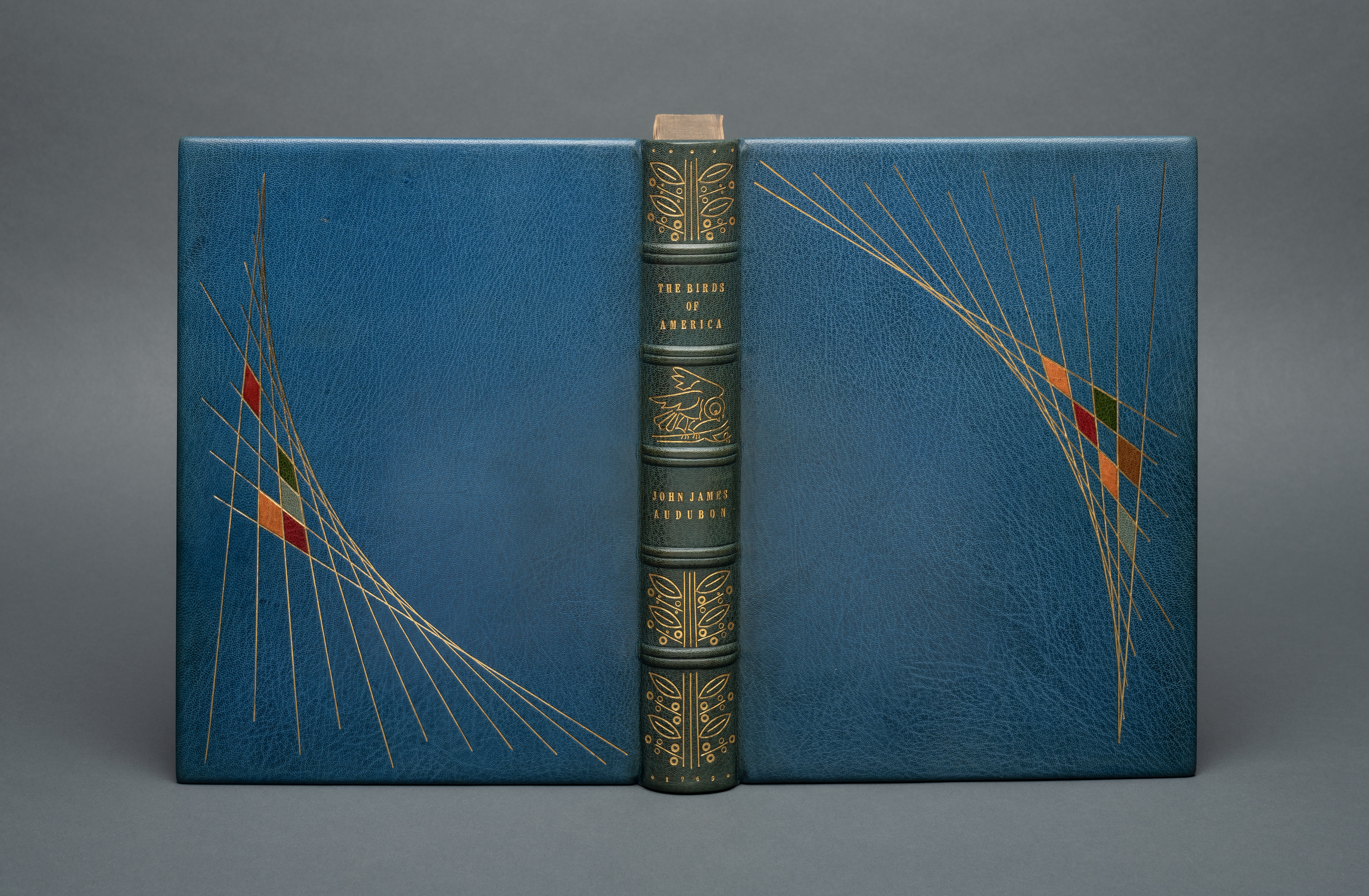

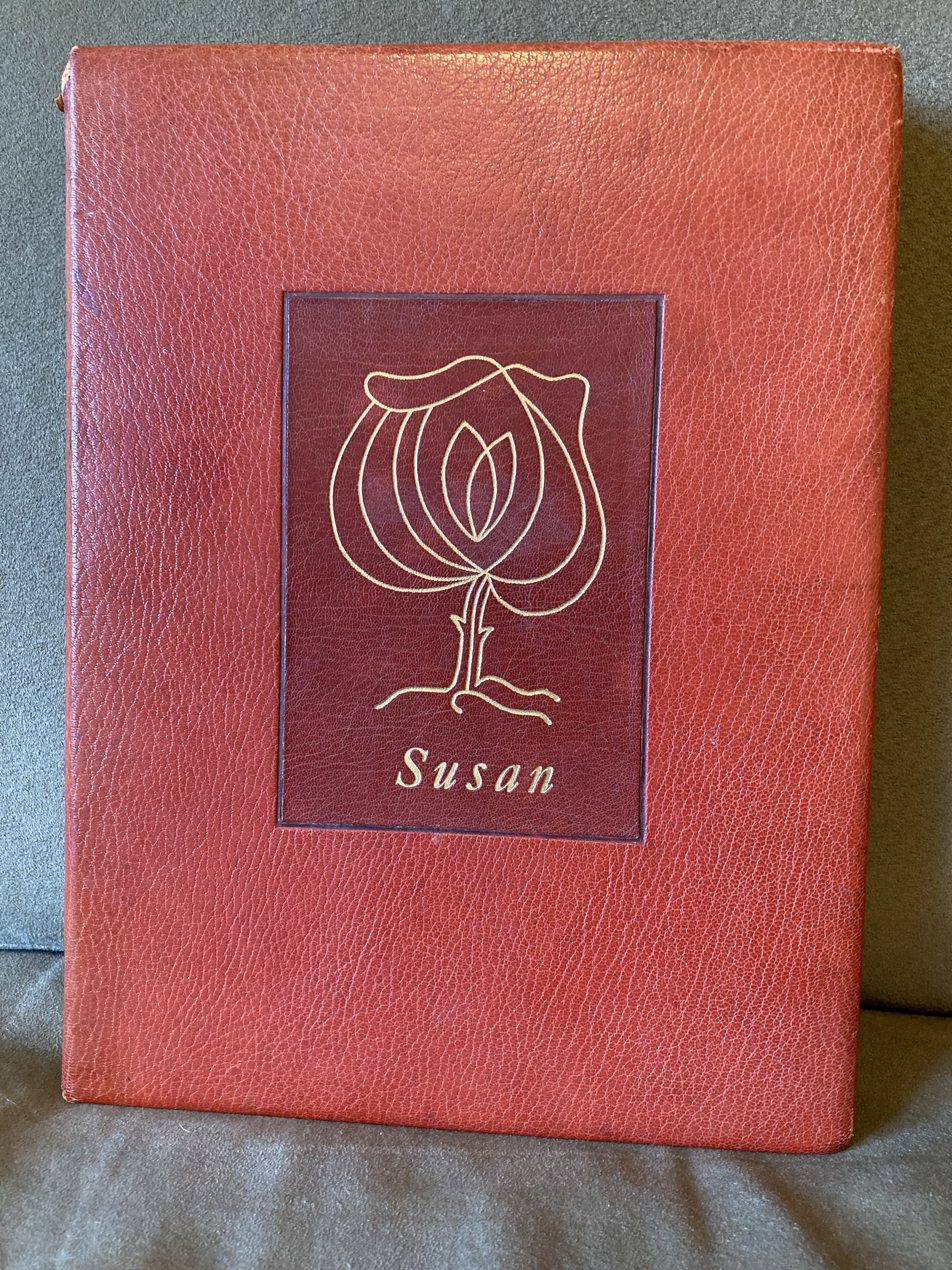

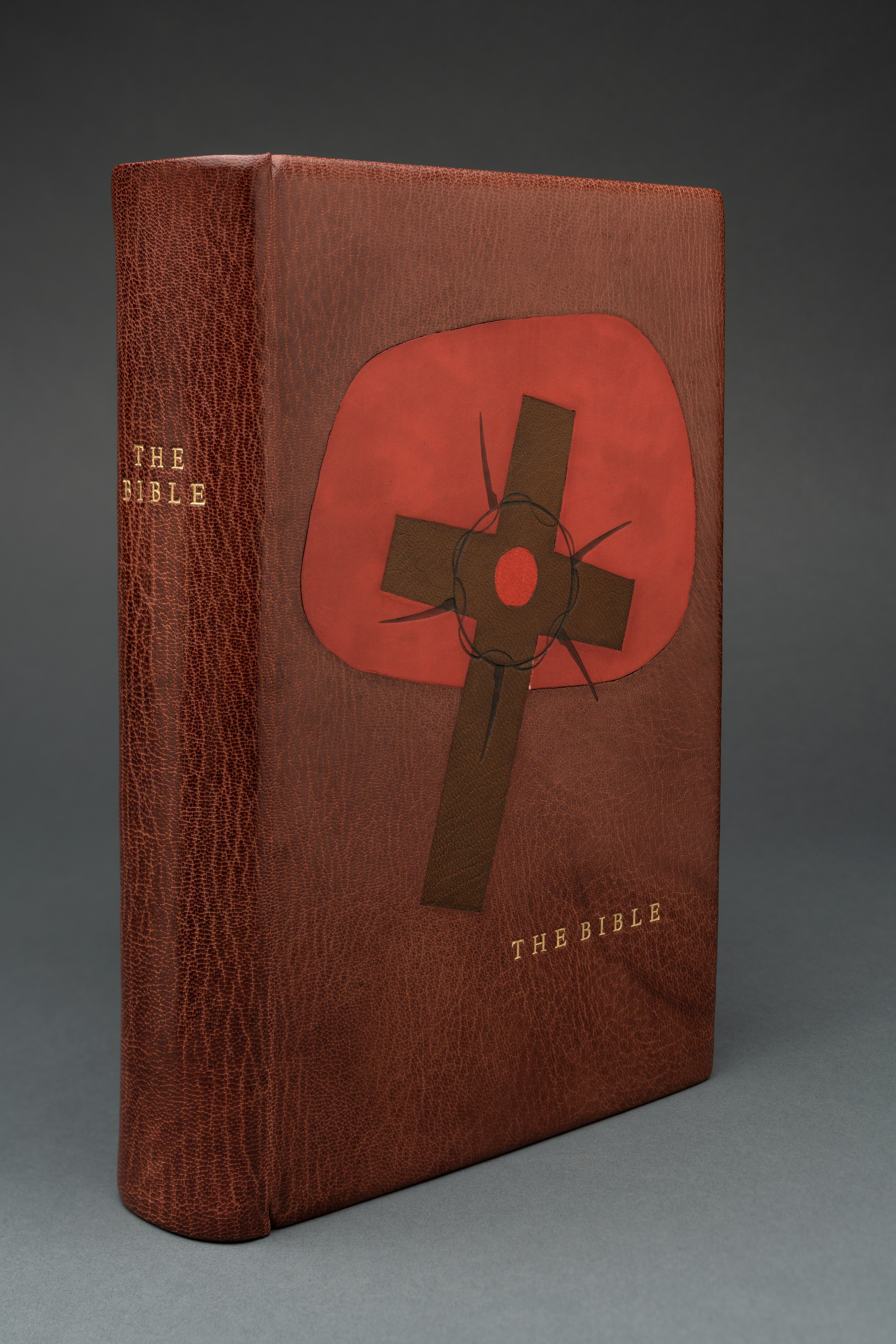

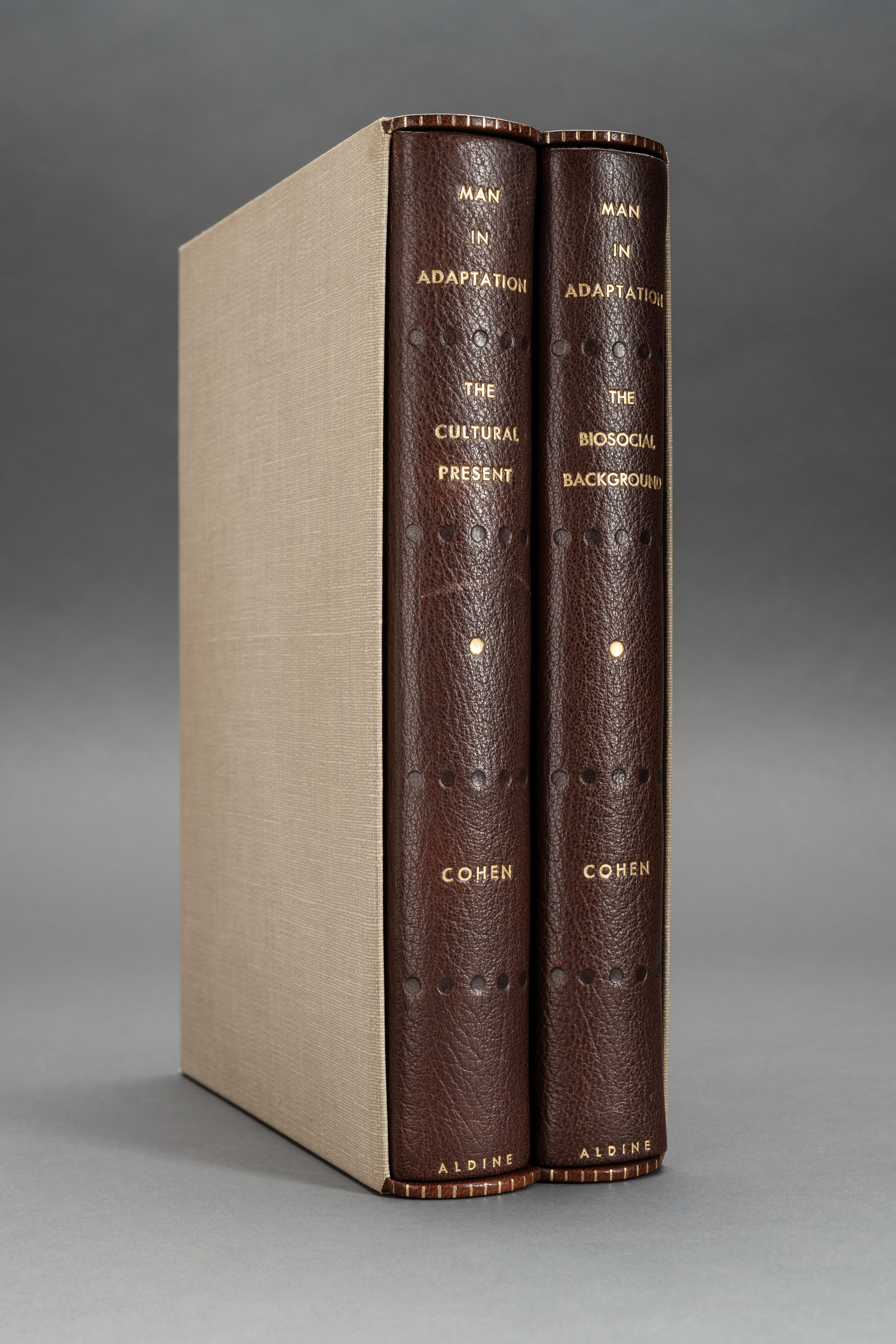

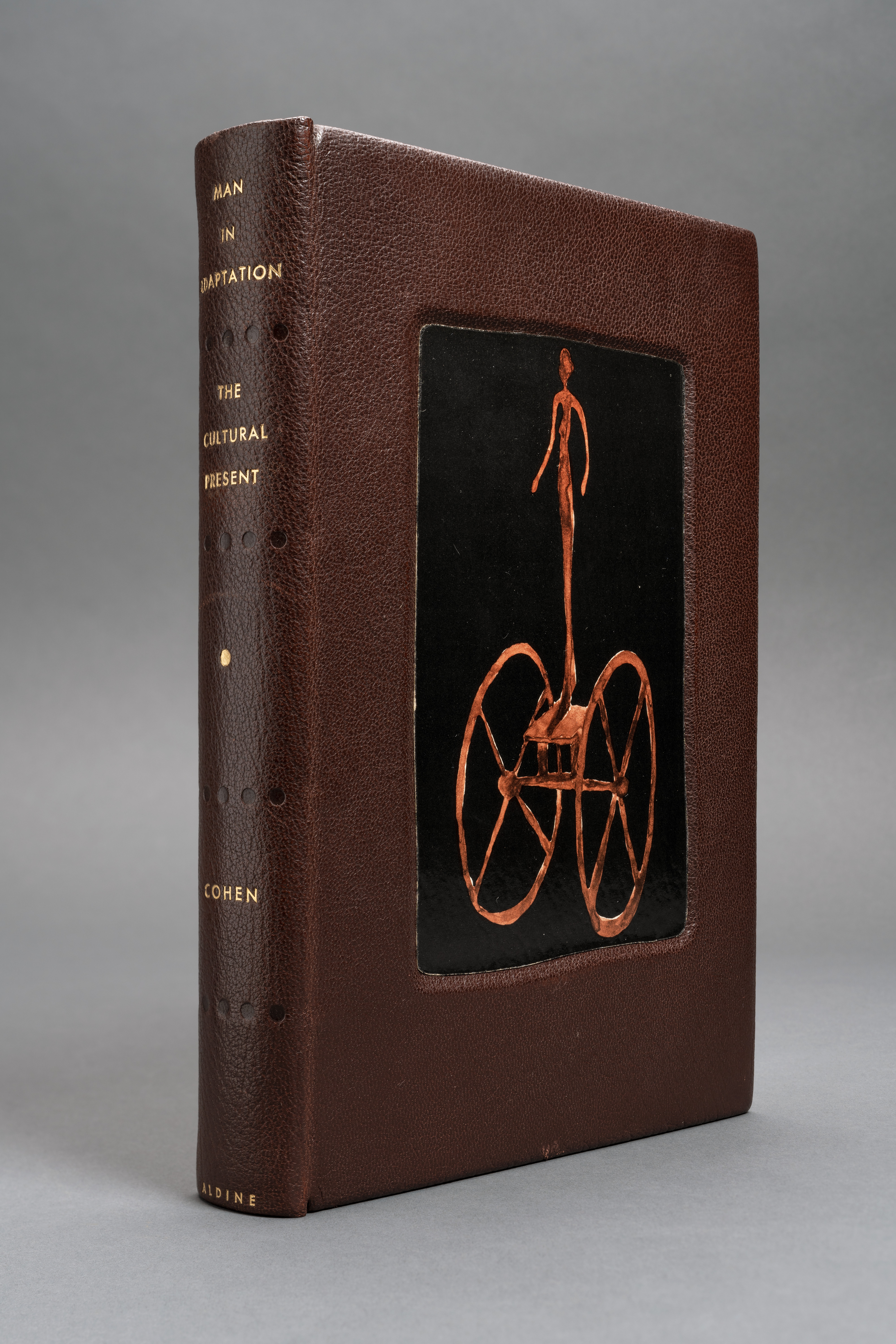

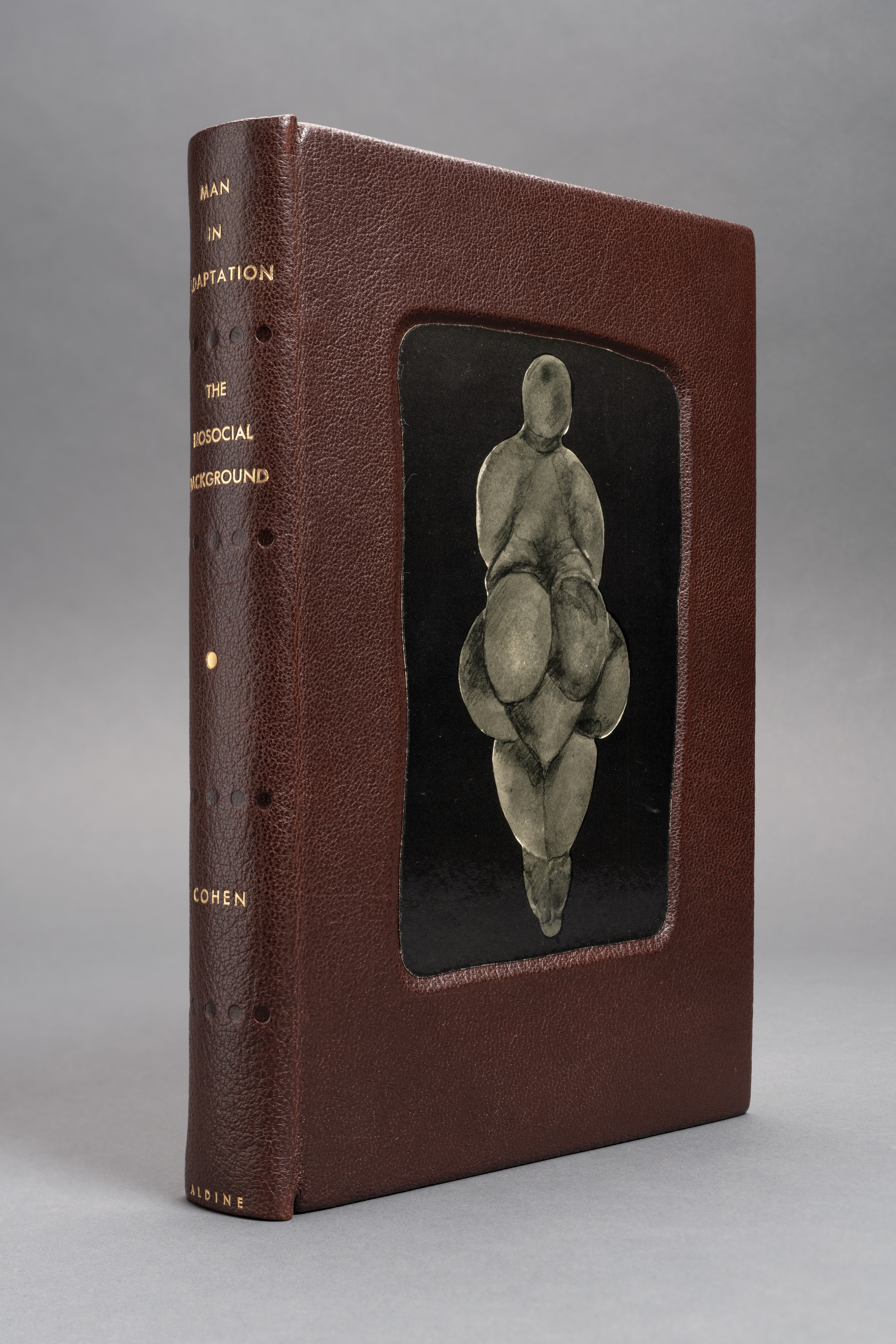

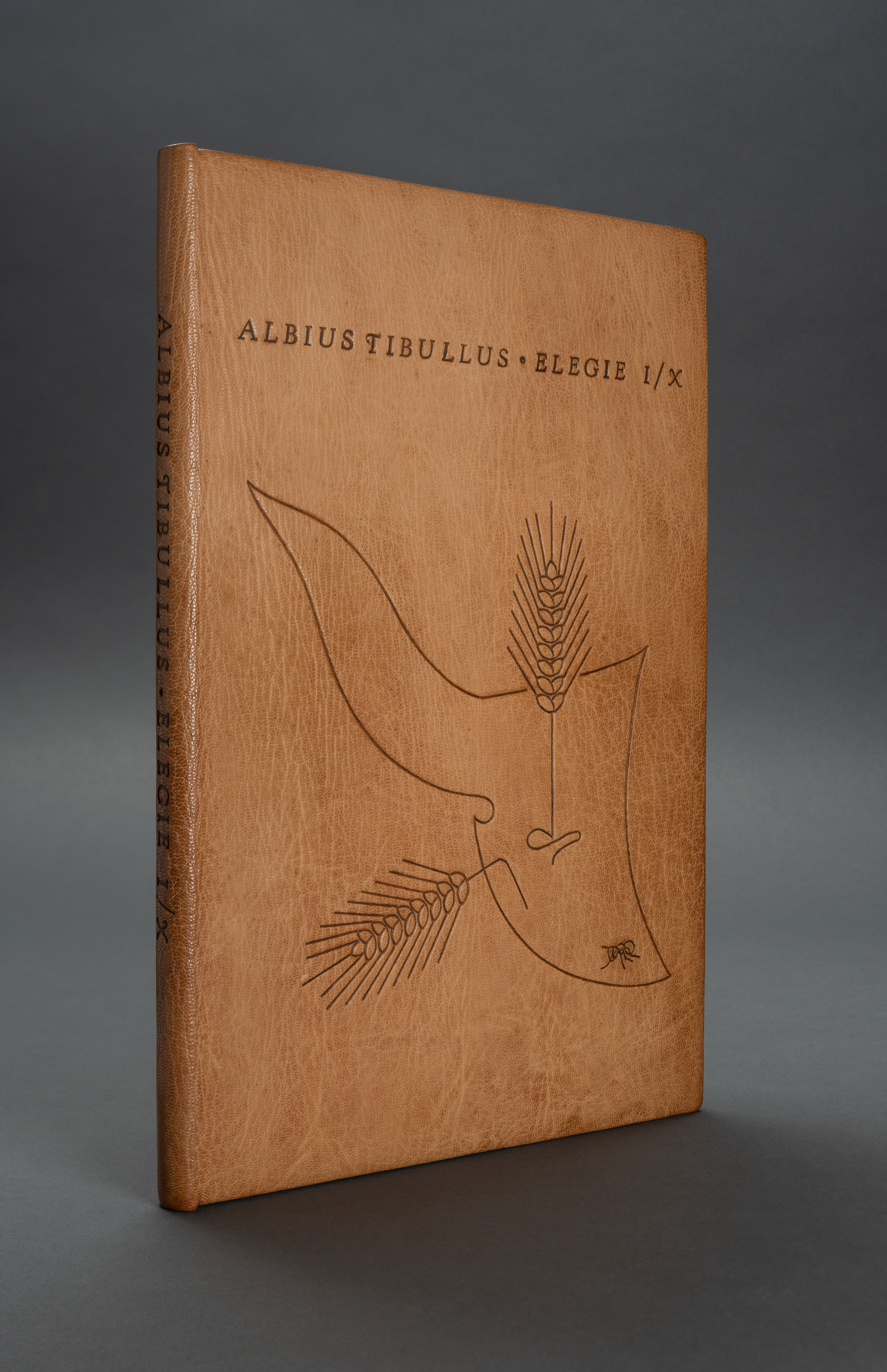

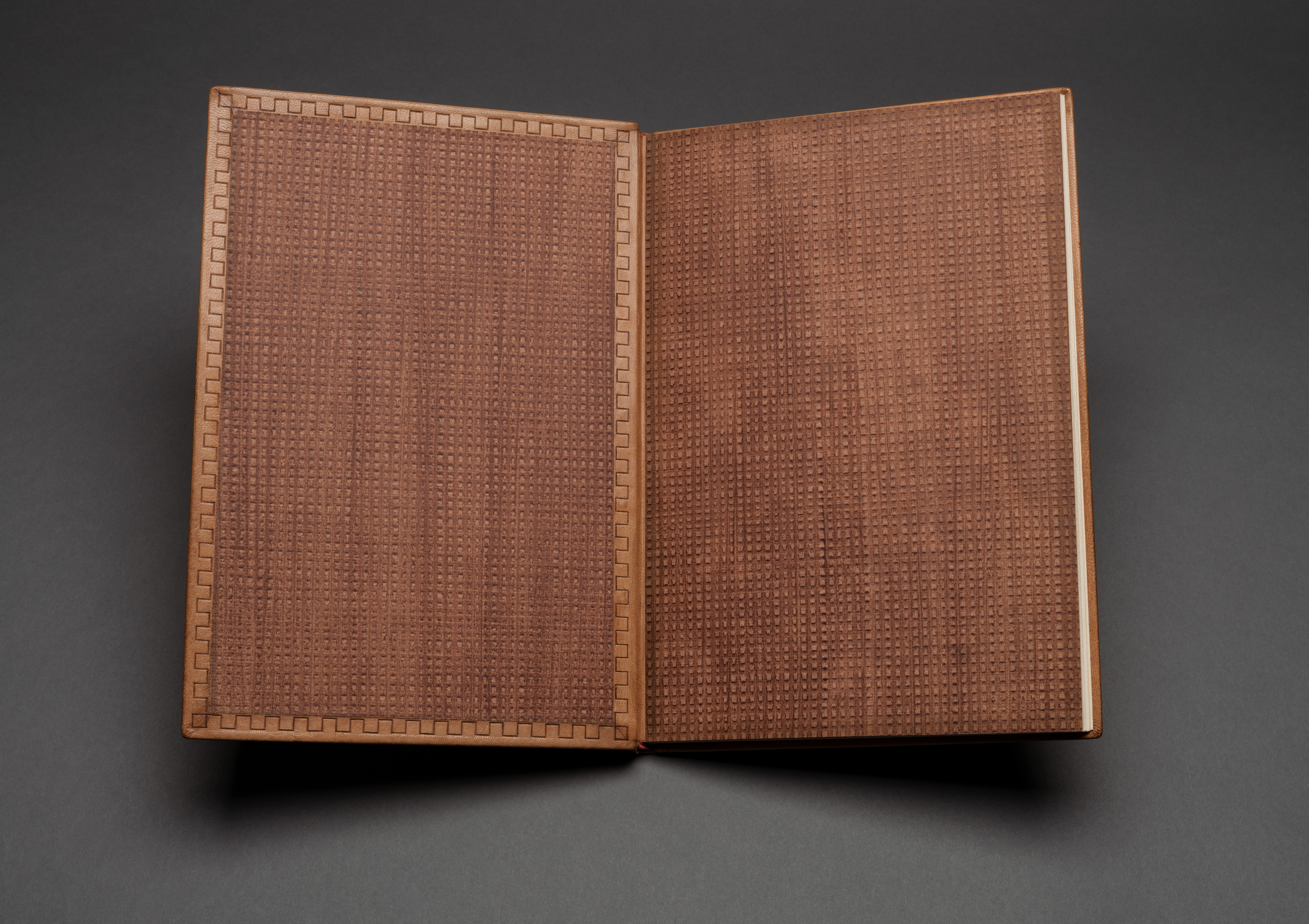

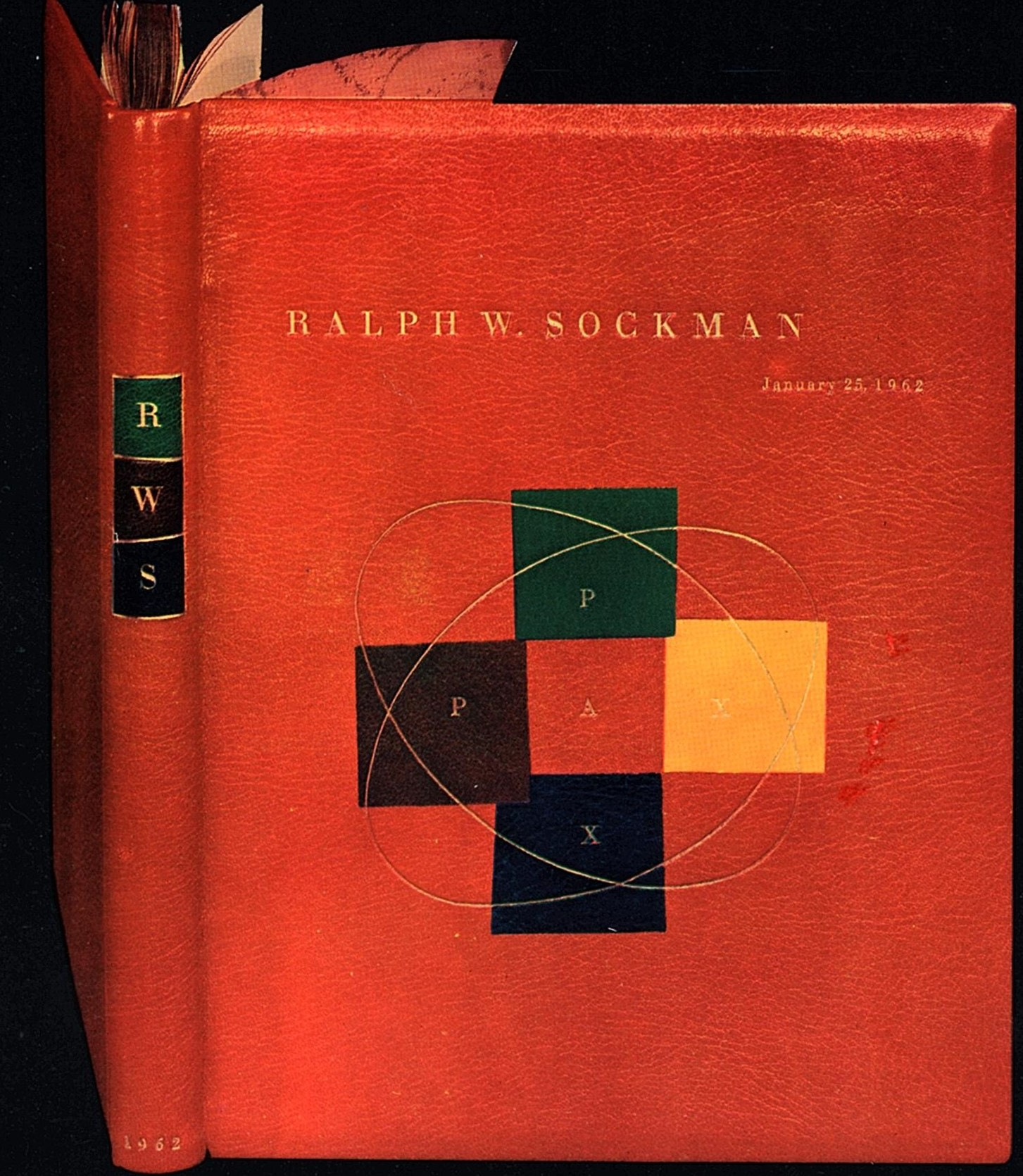

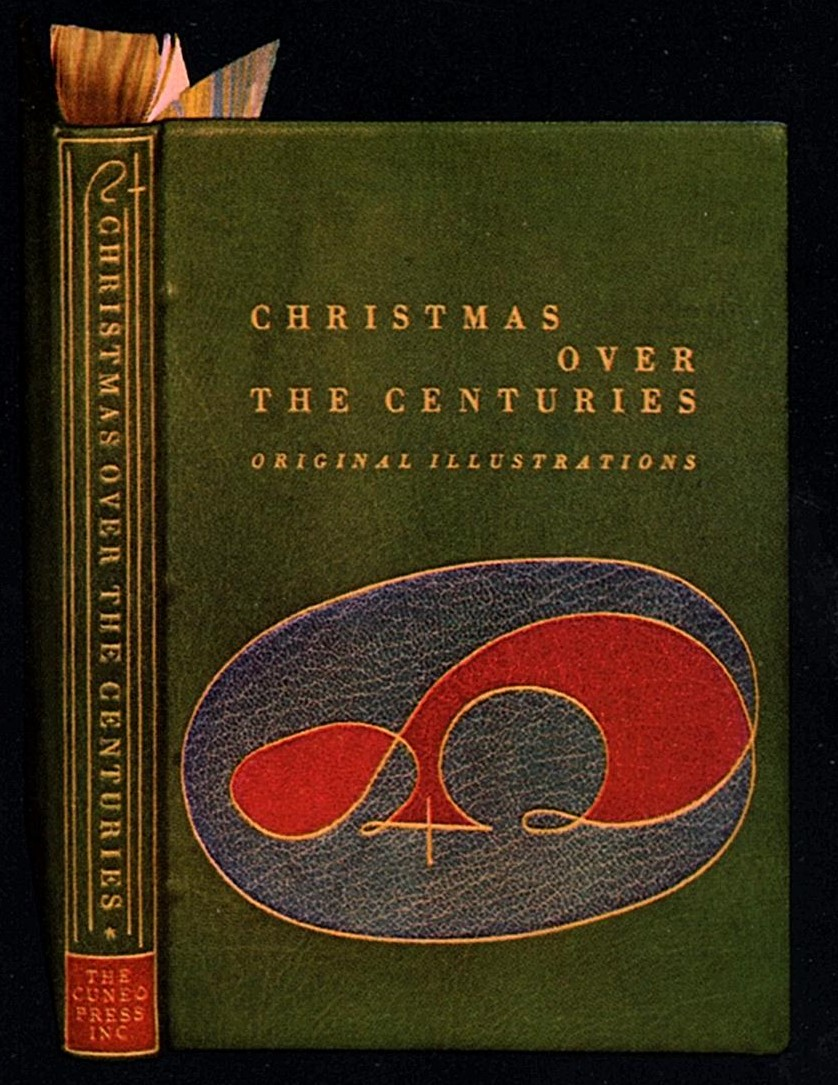

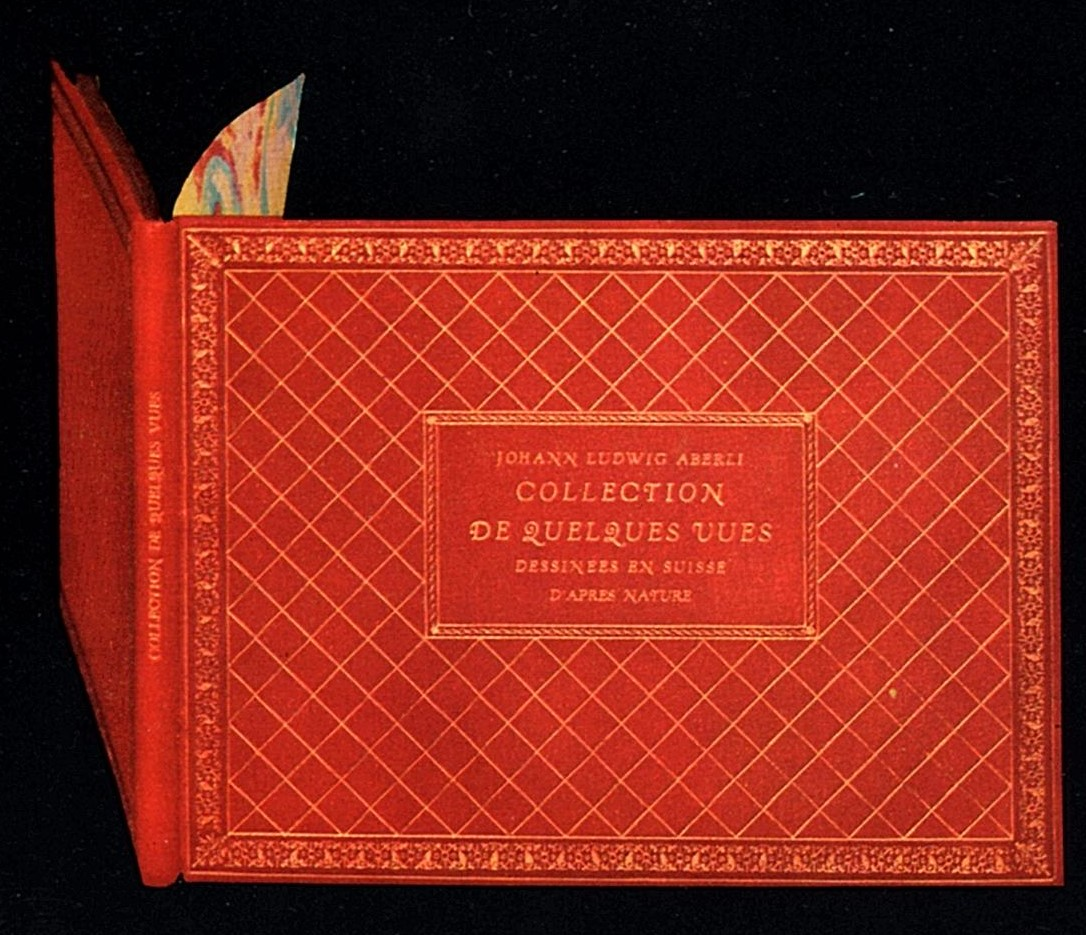
