= Bookbindings in the British Library =

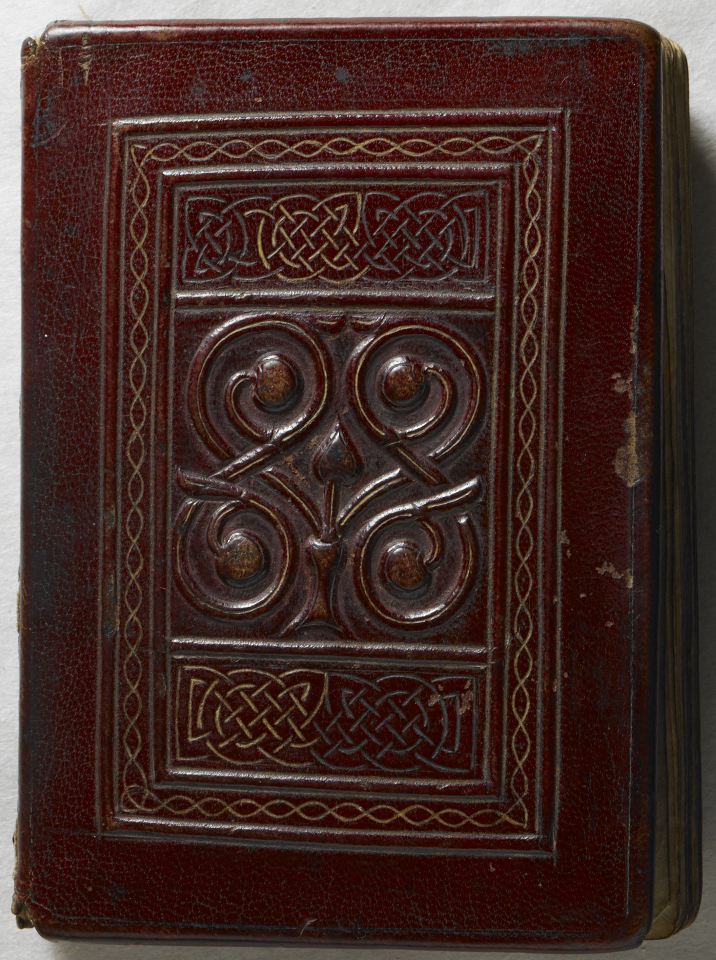
The original tooled red goatskin binding of the 7th century St Cuthbert Gospel is the earliest surviving Western binding

The British Library contains a wide range of fine and historic bookbindings; however, books in the Library are organised primarily by subject rather than by binding so the Library has produced a guide to enable researchers to identity bindings of interest. The collection includes the oldest intact Western bookbinding, the leather binding of the 7th century St Cuthbert Gospel.

Some gifts by, or purchases from, collectors of bindings are registered and kept together. A small number of bindings are always displayed in the Ritblat Gallery at the St Pancras site in London, and others can be examined in the reading rooms. There is also a display of the stamps and tools used for the books of George III near the entrance to the Conservation Centre.

== Gallery ==
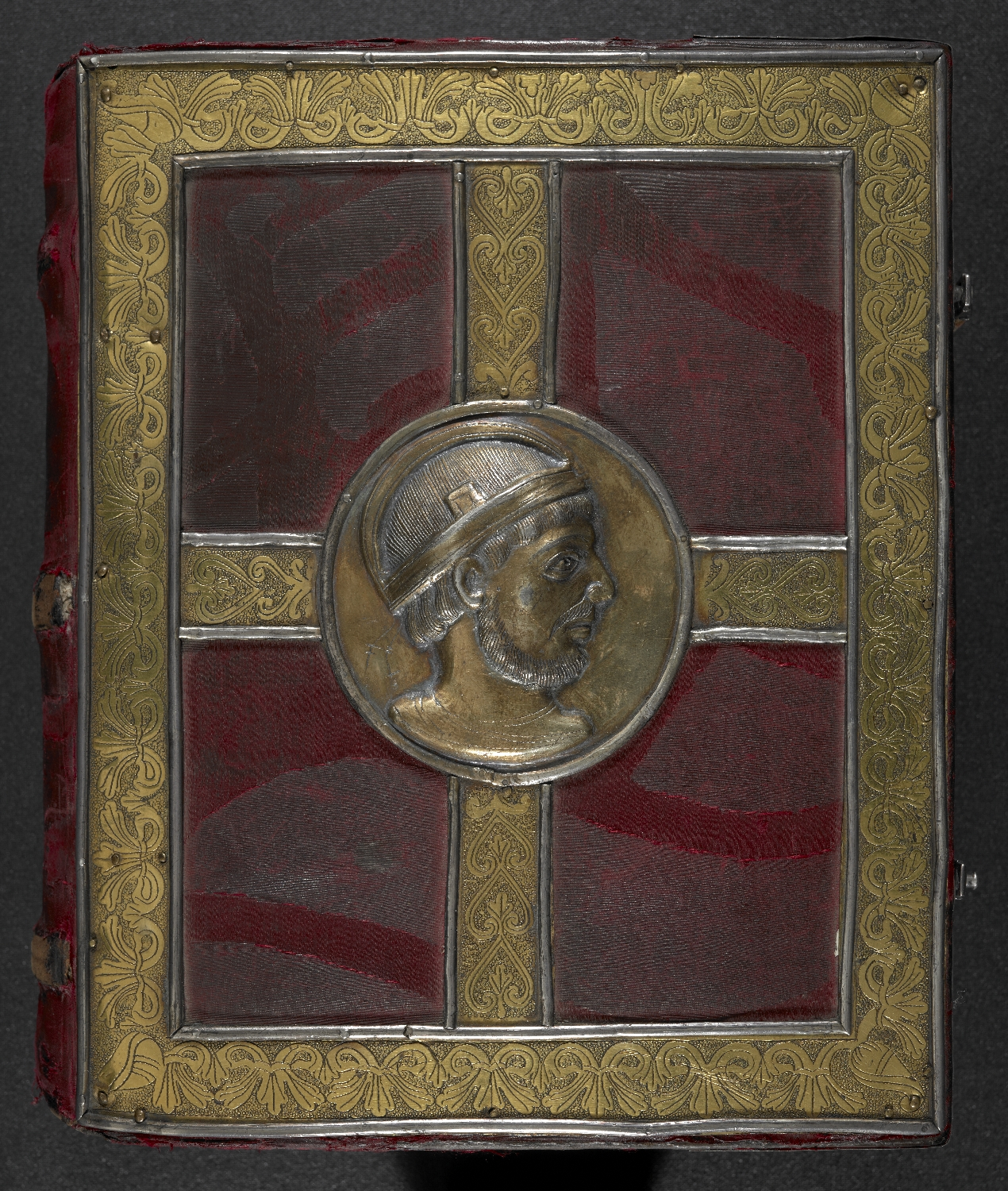
Treasure binding from the Psalter made for Lothair I (840-855)

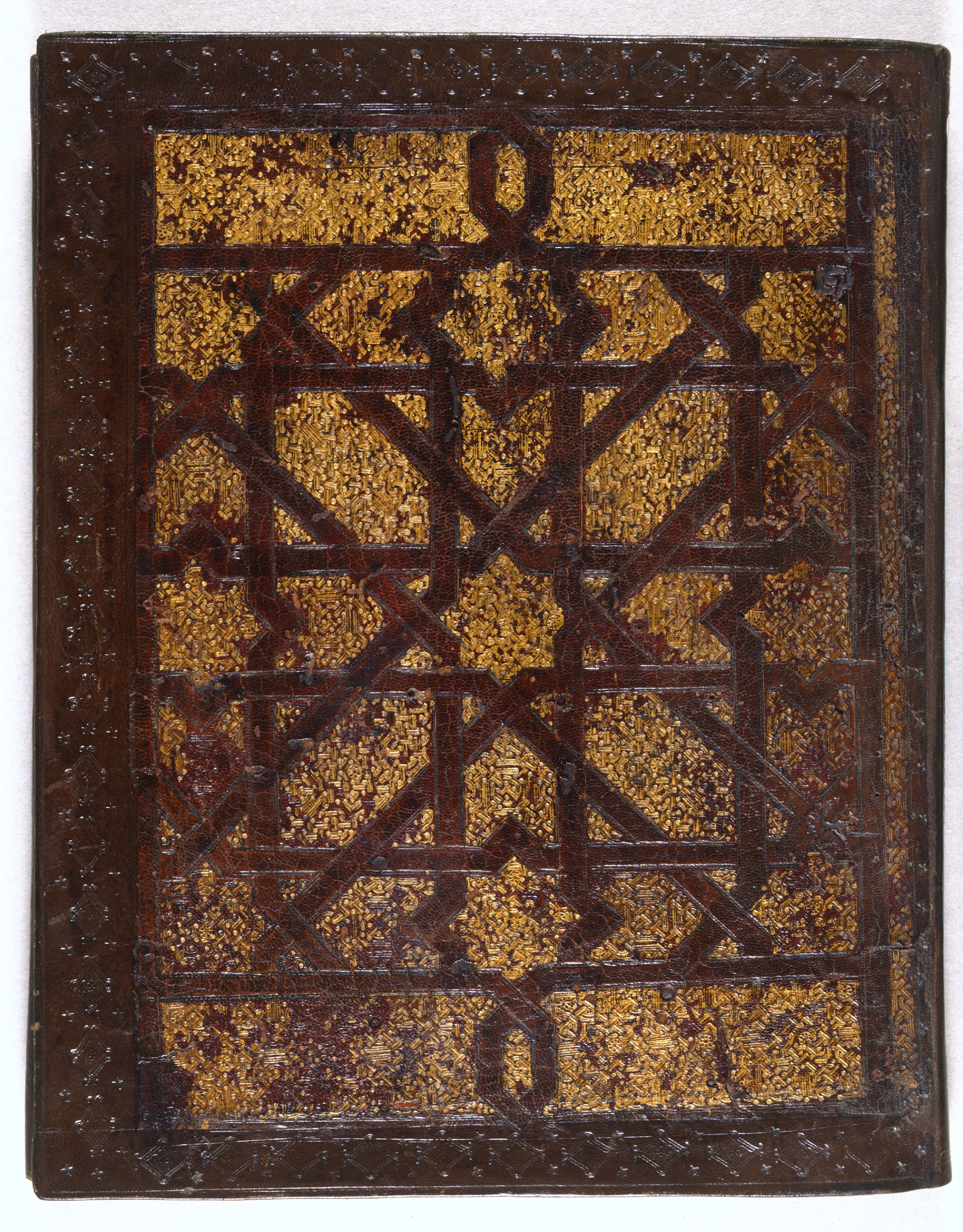
The oldest known gold-tooled binding in the world from the Qur'an copied by Abu Hafs Umar al-Murtada in Marakesh, 1256

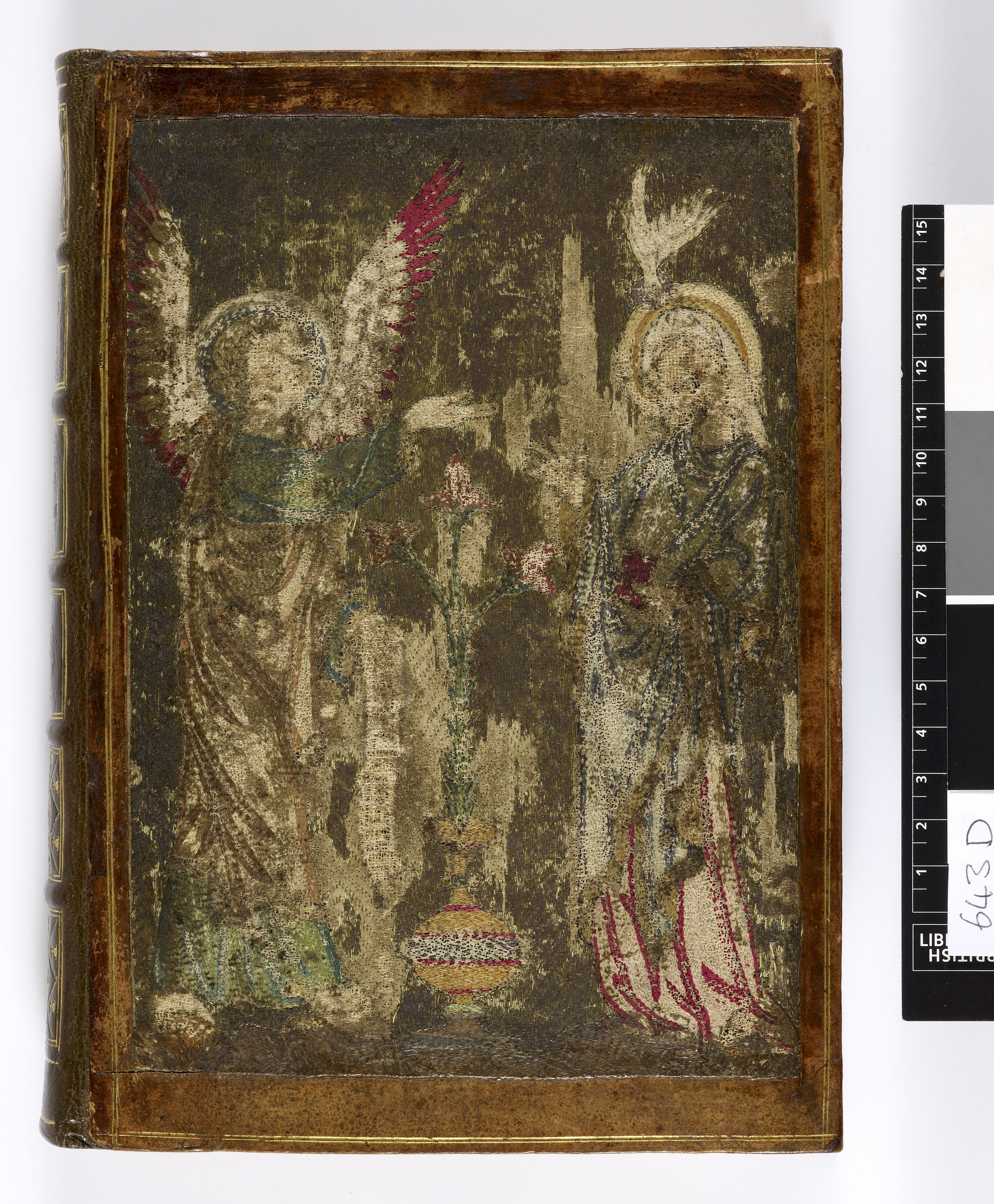
Binding from the Felbrigge Psalter, the oldest surviving embroidered binding from England. 14th century

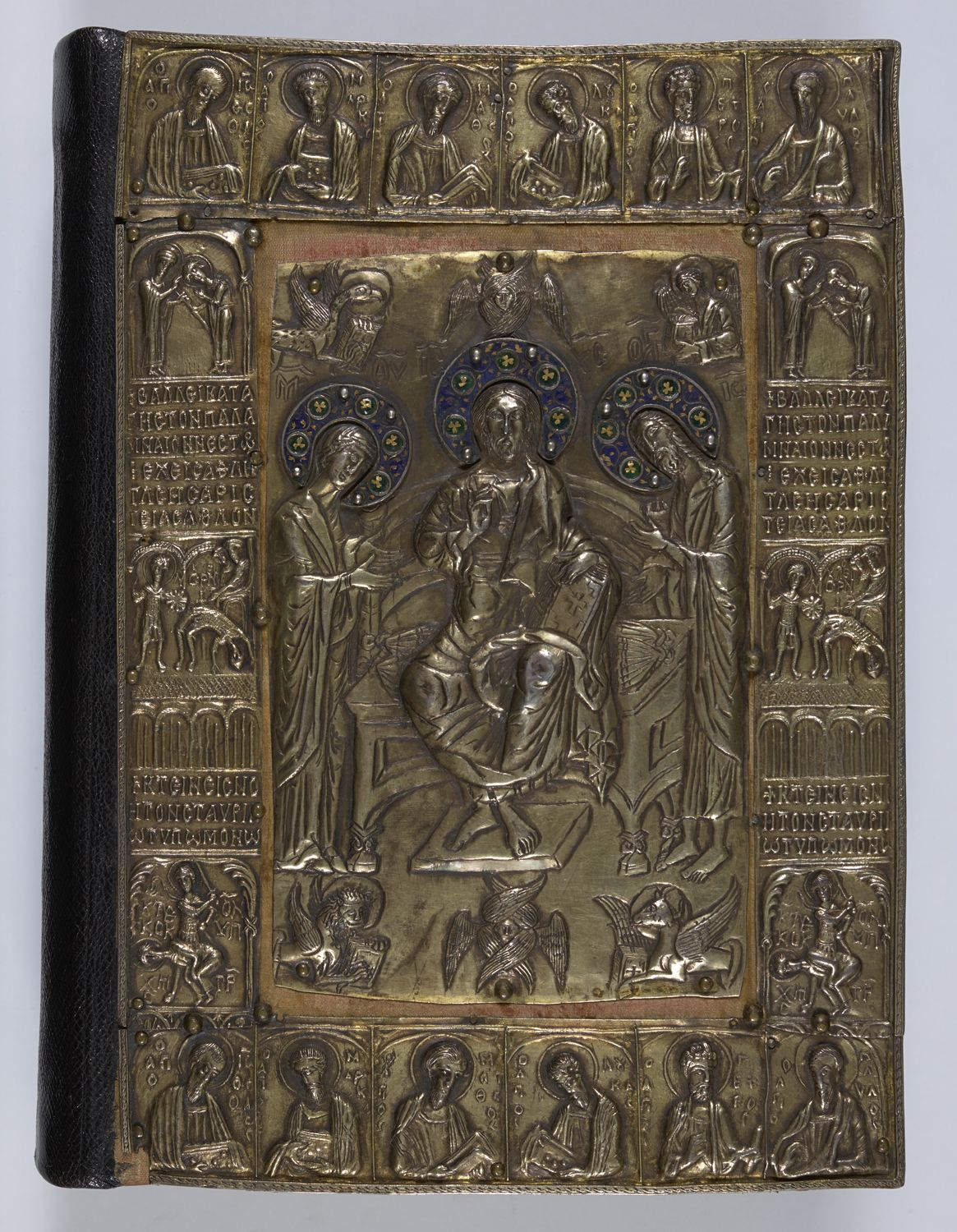
Treasure binding from the Guest-Coutts New Testament with scenes from the life of St Demetrius, of post-Byzantine date but probably based on a 14th-century template

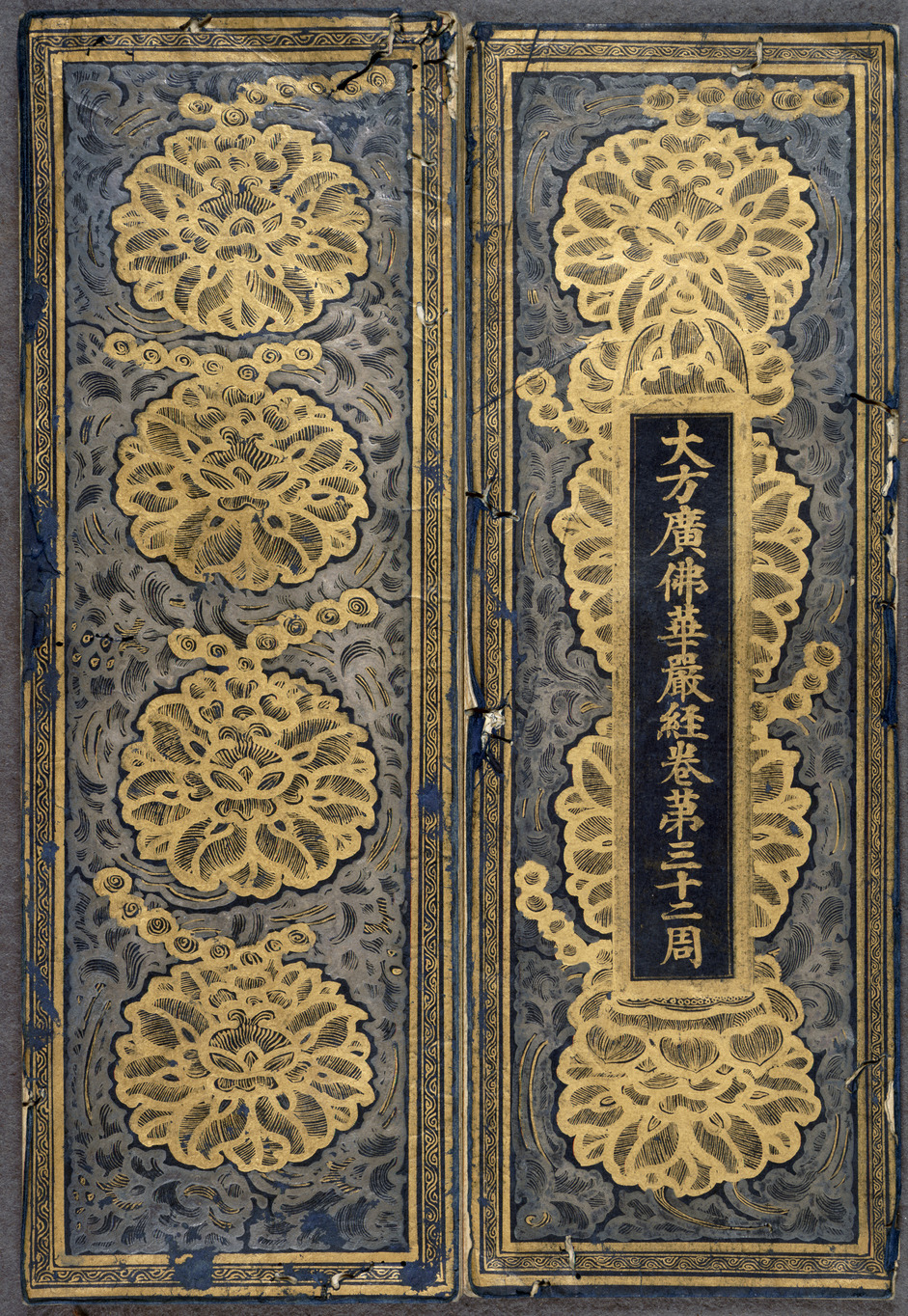
Covers of the Avatamsaka sutra. Korea, c. 1400

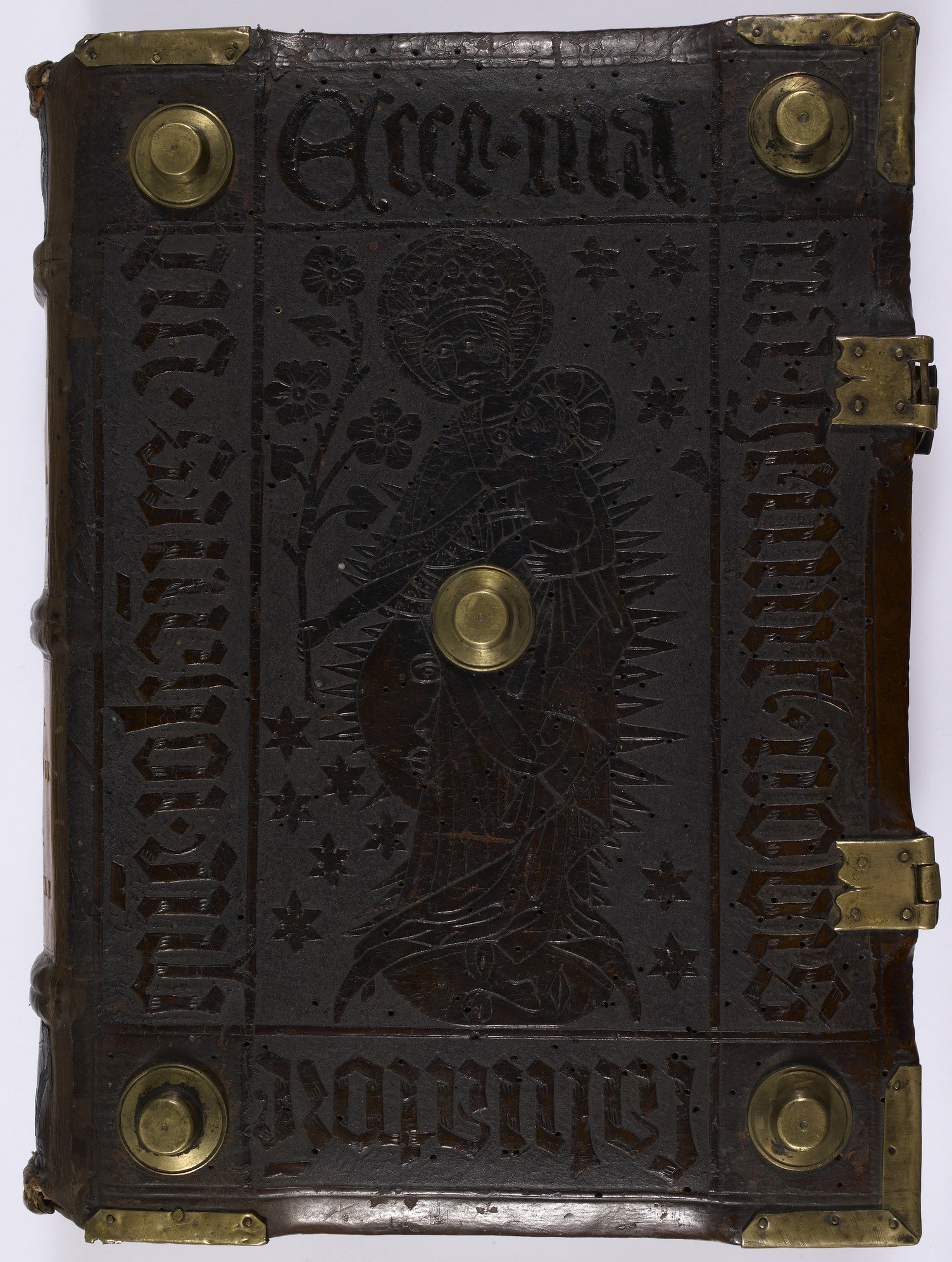
Front cover of Historia Scholastica by Petrus Comestor. Germany (Amerbach), c. 1451

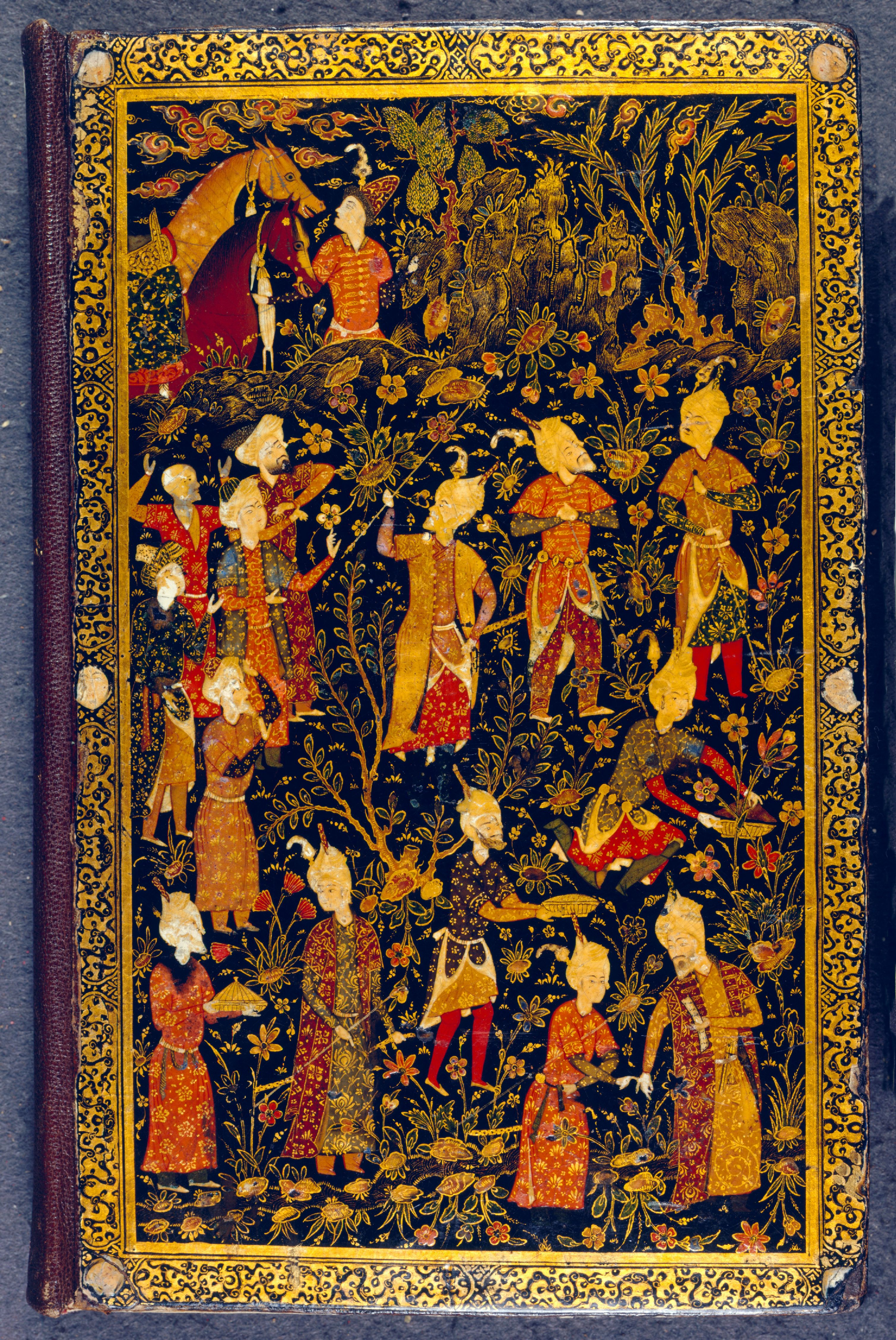
Cover of Divan of Nava'i with lacquer painting by Mir Sayyid Ali. Iran, c. 1540

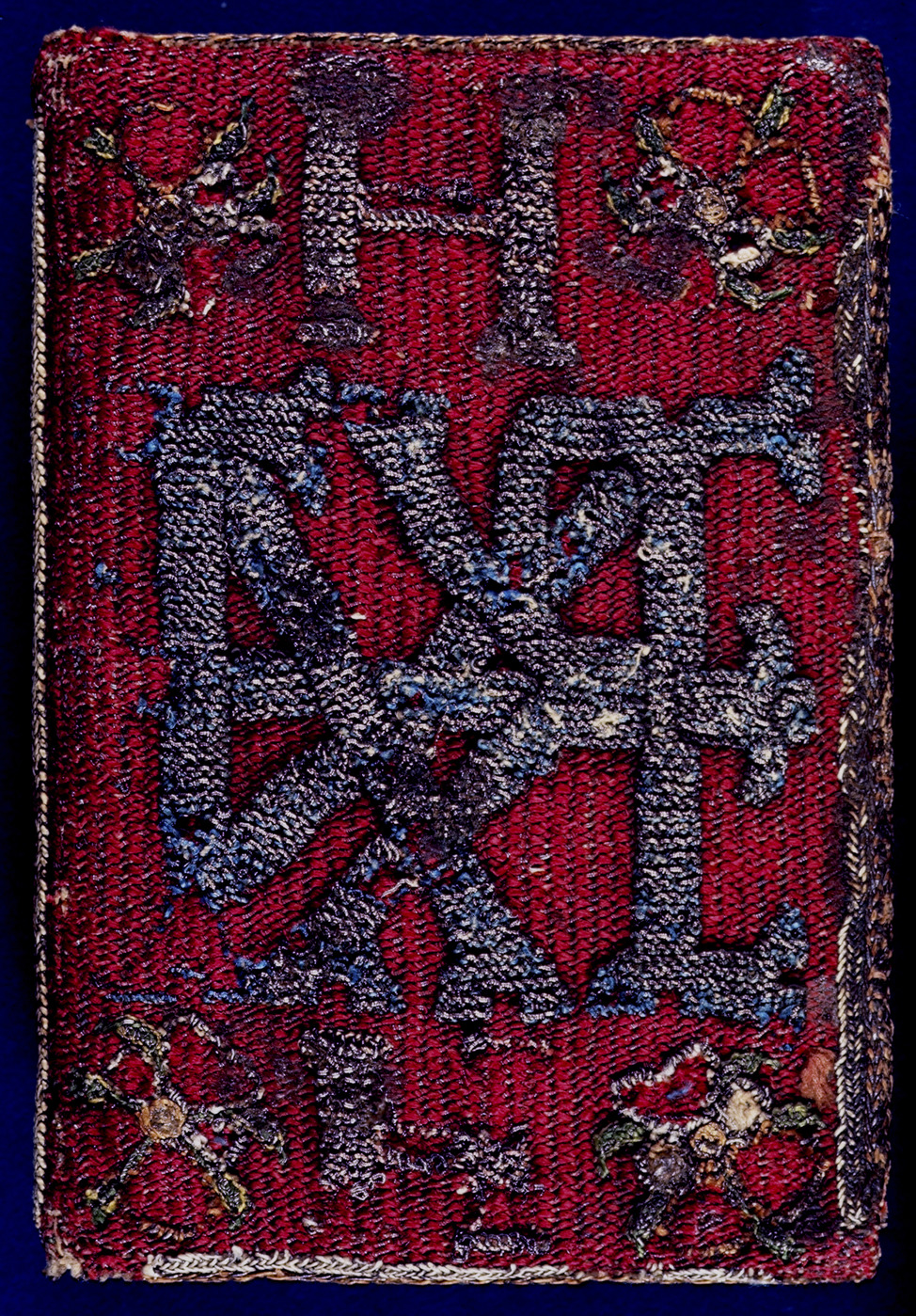
Embroidered back cover made for trilingual translation of Prayers or Meditations by princess Elizabeth. England, 1545

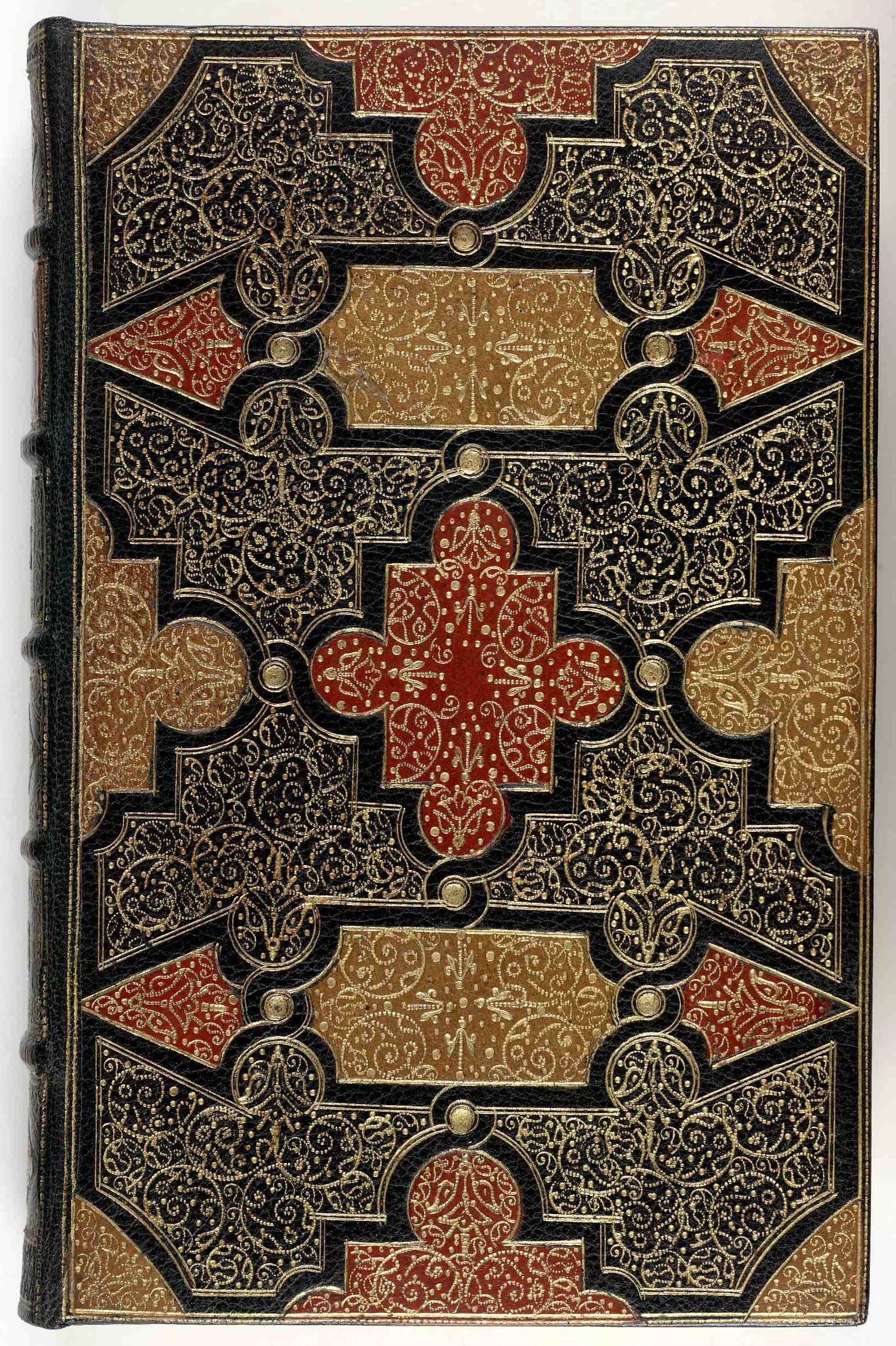
Cover of Homilies and sermons of John Chrysostom by royal bookbinder Antoine-Michel Padeloup. France, first half of the 18th century

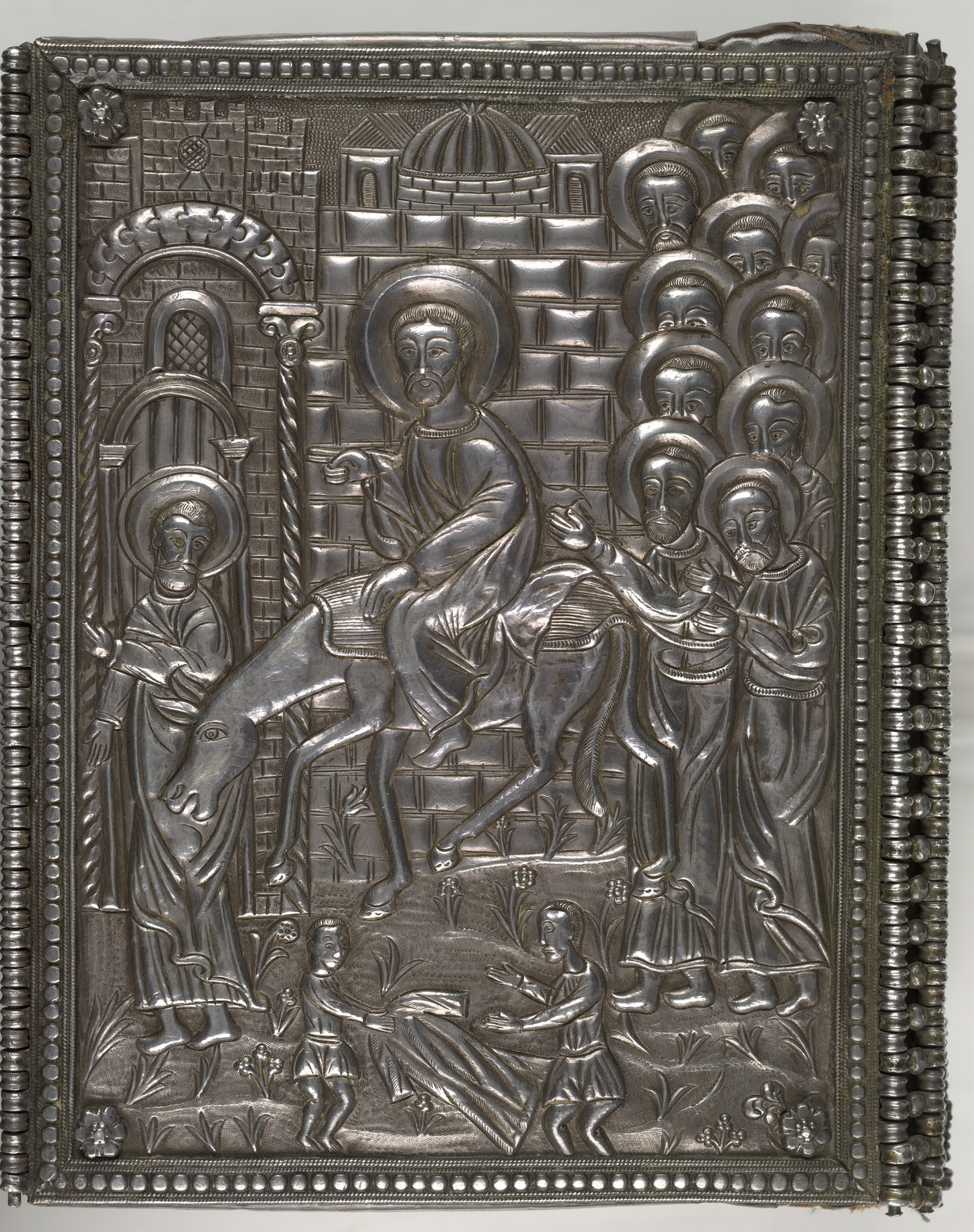
Silver binding of Armenian manuscript of Gospels made by the silversmith Eghiay in Kayeri (Caesarea) in 1755–1756. The relief depicts Christ's entry into Jerusalem.

== See also ==
- John Jaffray (bookbinder)
- Howard Nixon, scholar of bookbinding and deputy keeper, British Museum
