= John Jeffrey (disambiguation) =

John Jeffrey (born 1959) is a Scottish rugby union player.

John Jeffrey may also refer to:

- John Jeffrey (botanist) (1826–1854), Scottish botanist and plant-hunter
- John Jeffrey (judge), MP for Sussex, East Grinstead and Clitheroe
- John Jeffrey (civil servant), Permanent Under-Secretary of State for Scotland

== See also ==
- John Jeffery (disambiguation)
- Jeffrey John, priest
- John Jeffreys (disambiguation)
- John Jeffries (disambiguation)
- John Jaffray (disambiguation)
