= John Jeffreys =

John Jeffreys may refer to:

- John R. F. Jeffreys (1916–1944), British mathematician and World War II codebreaker
- John Gwyn Jeffreys (1809–1885), British conchologist and malacologist
- J. G. Jeffreys (1893–?), Australian schoolteacher who moved to England and founded Bryanston School in Dorset
- John Jeffreys (died 1689), British member of parliament for Brecon and Breconshire
- John Jeffreys (died 1715) (c. 1659–1715), British member of parliament for Breconshire, Marlborough and Radnorshire
- John Jeffreys (1706–1766), British member of parliament for Breconshire and Dartmouth

== See also ==
- John Jeffrey (disambiguation)
- John Jeffries (disambiguation)
