= Felbrigge Psalter =

13th-century illuminated manuscript

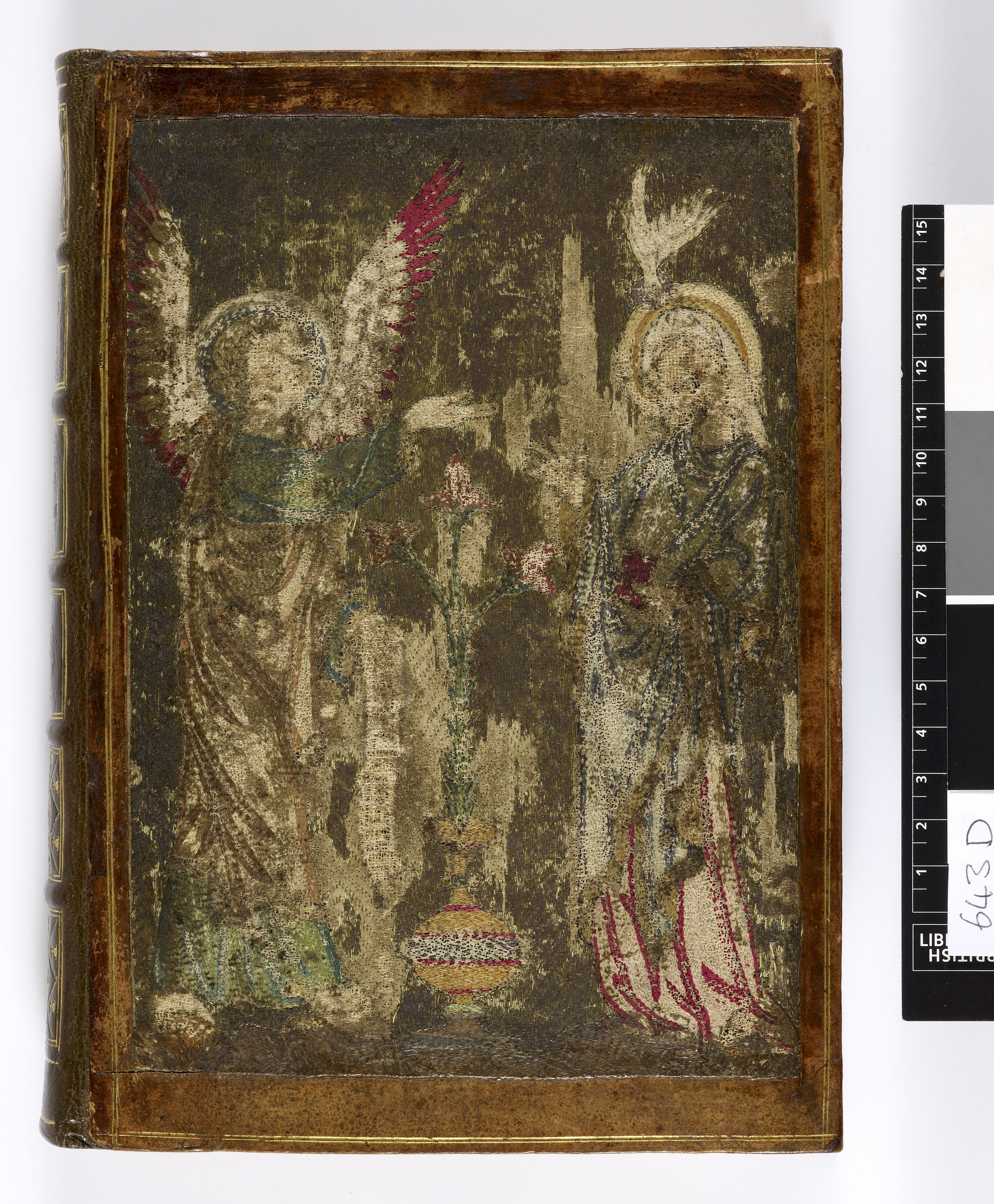
Upper cover of the Felbrigge Psalter, modern photo.

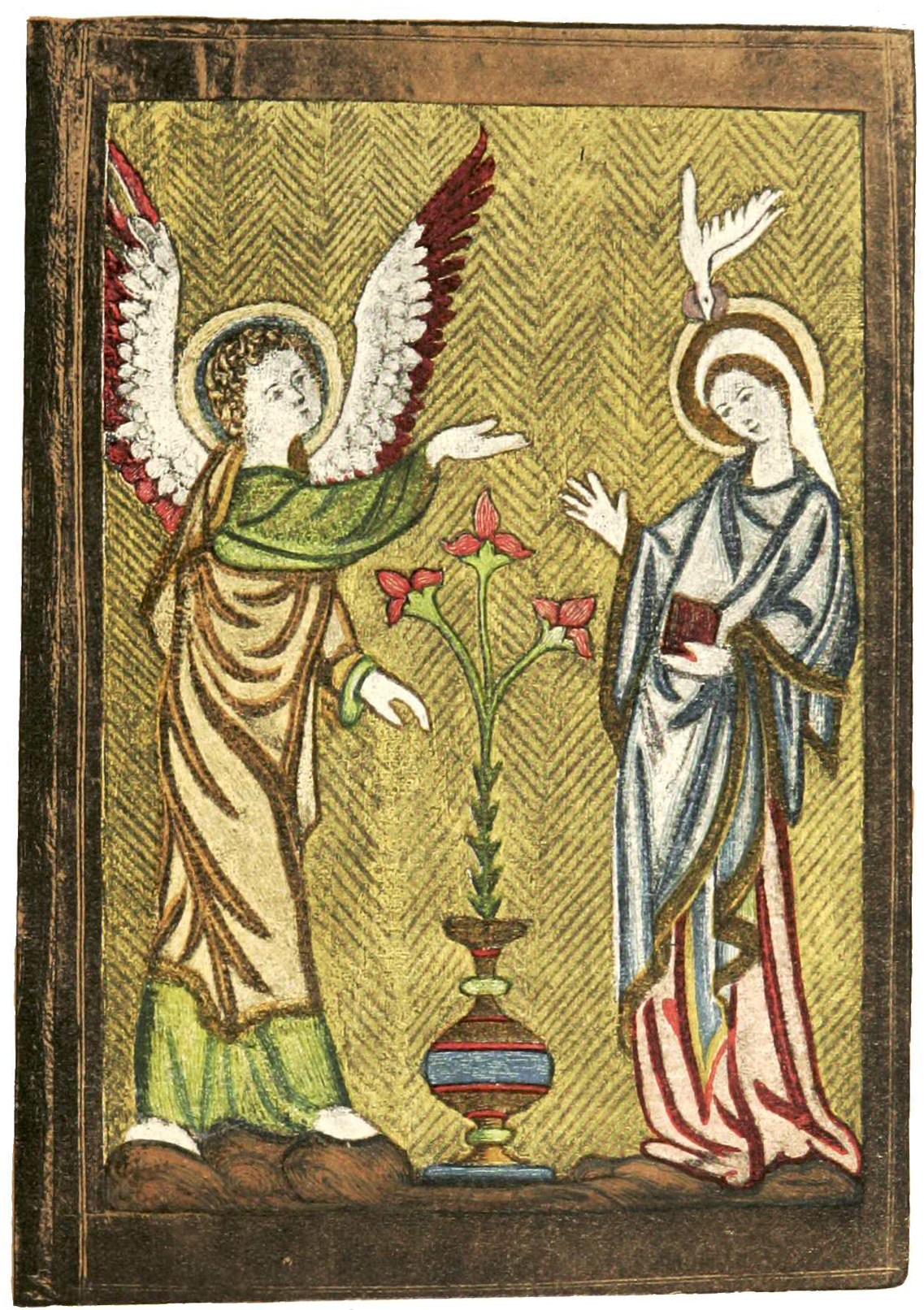
Upper cover of the Felbrigge Psalter; Victorian book illustration

The Felbrigge Psalter is an illuminated manuscript Psalter from mid-13th century England that has an embroidered bookbinding which probably dates to the early 14th century. It is the oldest surviving book from England to have an embroidered binding. The embroidery is worked in fine linen with an illustration of the Annunciation on the front cover and an illustration of the Crucifixion on the back.

== Embroidery ==
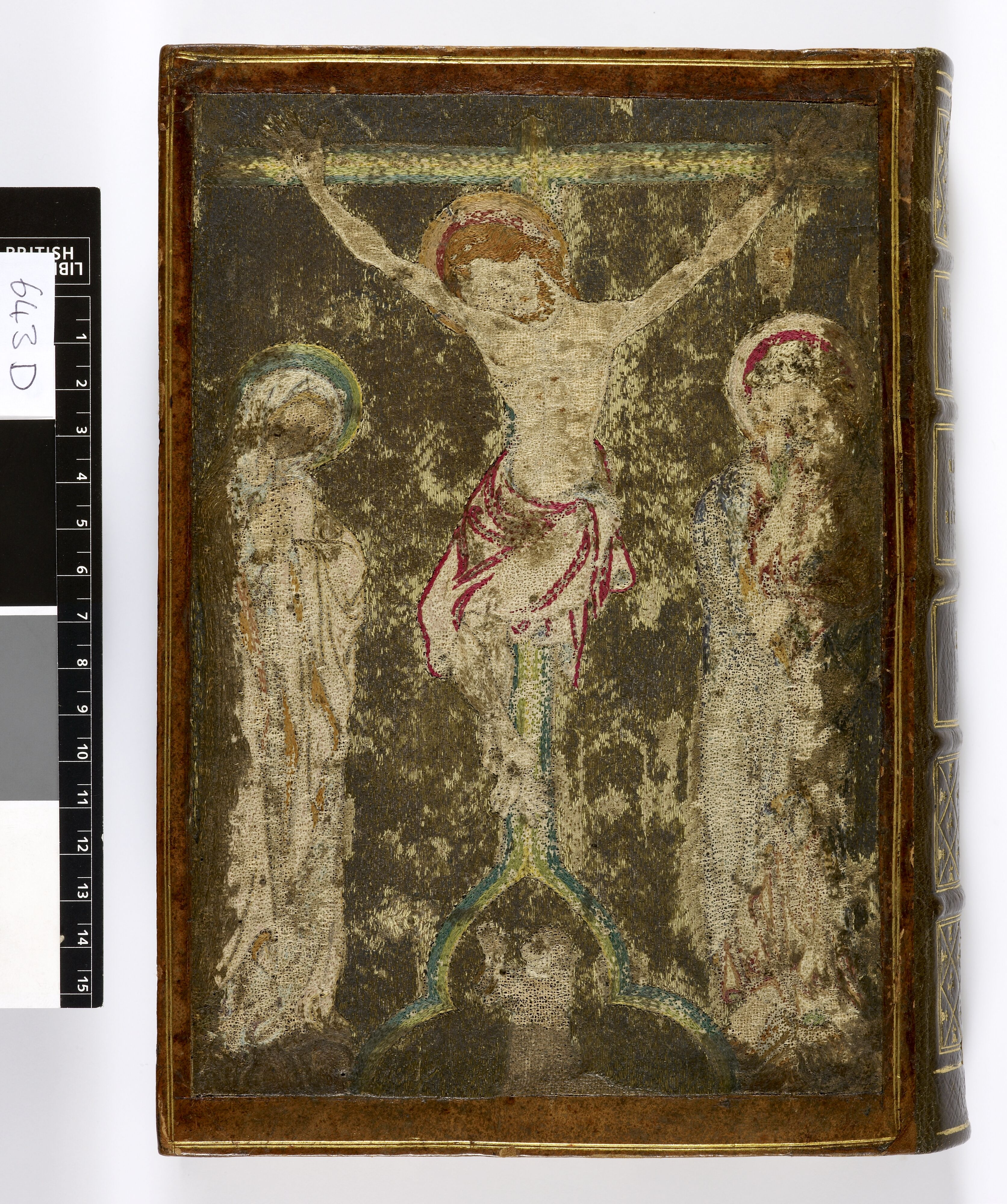
Lower cover

The cover embroidery is 7 3/4" by 5 3/4", couched in a zigzag pattern using fine gold thread. The remainder is worked in linen floss using a split stitch that flows independently from the mesh of the canvas. In the opinion of Cyril Davenport, the embroidery on this book is very high quality: "I know of no other instance for which appropriateness of workmanship, or charm of design, can compare with this, the earliest of all." Davenport praises both the technical quality of the stitching and the overall rendering of the figures and drapery. See illustration for the front cover.

Davenport describes the back cover in the following manner:

On the lower side, on a groundwork of gold similar to that on the upper cover, is a design of the Crucifixion. Our Saviour wears a red garment round the loins, and round his head is a red and yellow nimbus, his feet being crossed in a manner often seen in illuminations in ancient manuscripts. The cross is yellow with a green edge, the foot widening out into a triple arch, within which is a small angel kneeling in the attitude of prayer. On the right of the cross is a figure of the Virgin Mary, in robes of pale blue and yellow, with a white head-dress and green and yellow nimbus. On the left is another figure, probably representing St. John, dressed in robes of red and blue, and having a nimbus round his head of concentric rings of red and yellow. This figure is unfortunately in very bad condition. The edges of the leaves of the book are painted with heraldic bearings in diamond-shaped spaces, that of the Felbrigge family 'Gules, a lion rampant, or' alternately with another 'azure, a 32 fleur-de-lys, or.'

By the close of the 19th century, when Davenport wrote, the book had been rebound in leather. The back embroidery had been quite done away with and the embroidered sides had been damaged both by time and by efforts at repair. The two panels have been laid into a calf leather binding dating from the 18th century. No other embroidered English book survives from this early period; the next oldest dates from approximately 1536.

Grace Christie wrote in 1928 "The Felbrigge Psalter is the only example of existing Opus Anglicanum worked before 1350 with a 'surface' couched gold ground."

== Ownership ==
The book takes its name from Anne de Felbrigge, a nun at a convent of Minoresses at Bruisyard, Suffolk, who is known to have been an early owner of the book and was probably its embroiderer. Anne de Felbrigge had an aristocratic background: she was the daughter of Sir Simon de Felbrigge, of Felbrigg Hall, Felbrigg, who was standard-bearer to Richard II.

In the 18th century the Psalter was in the possession of Hans Sloane, whose collection was the foundation for the British Library, which opened in 1753. It is catalogued as MS Sloane 2400.
