= John Jeffries (disambiguation) =

John Jeffries (1745–1819) was a physician and scientist.

John Jeffries may also refer to:

- John Calvin Jeffries (born c. 1948), law professor
- John Jeffries II (1796–1876), American ophthalmic surgeon
- John Jeffries (judge) (1929-2019), former judge, local politician and senior civil servant

== See also ==
- John Jeffries Award, awarded to Harry George Armstrong
- John Jeffreys (disambiguation)
- John Jeffrey (disambiguation)
