= John Jeffery =

John Jeffery may refer to:

- John Jeffery (rugby union) (born 1945), Wales rugby union international
- John Jeffery (South African politician), South African politician
- John Jeffery (priest) (1647–1720), Anglican priest and author
- John Jeffery (MP) (c. 1751–1822), MP for Poole, 1796–1809

== See also ==
- John Jeffrey (disambiguation)
