= John Jaffray =

John Jaffray may refer to:

- Sir John Jaffray, 1st Baronet (1818–1901), British journalist and newspaper proprietor
- John Jaffray (bookbinder) (1811–1869), English bookbinder active in the early Chartist movement
- Sir John Henry Jaffray, 3rd Baronet (1893–1916) of the Jaffray baronets
