= Embroidered binding =

Decorative cloth book binding

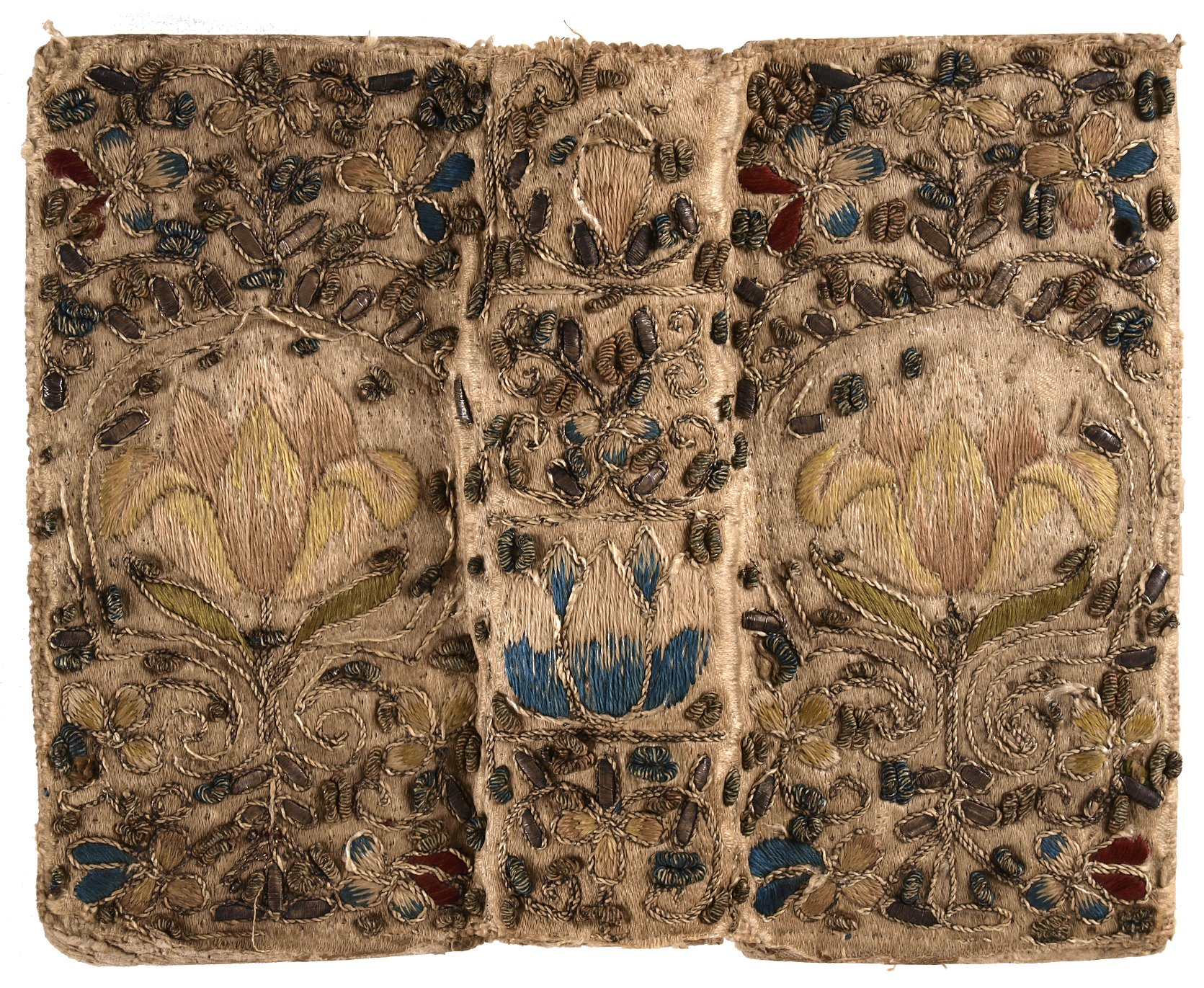
Early 17th century embroidered binding on the Folger Shakespeare Library's copy of STC 2943

Embroidered binding, also referred to as needlework or textile binding, describes a book bound in cloth and decorated with a design on one or both covers and sometimes the spine. The binding is created for the individual book.

== History ==
Embroidered bindings were produced by professional as well as amateur embroiderers or needleworkers.

Examples of embroidered bookbindings are known throughout England and Europe from the 13th century to the present, and were most popular in England during the first half of the 17th century. These bindings were most often created for prayer books, Bibles, devotional texts, and as presentation copies for clergy or the royal family.

== Designs ==
Designs include flowers and foliage, sacred emblems or royal portraits, arabesque, heraldic, or figural elements. "The most common designs were Old Testament scenes featuring Adam and Eve, Moses and Aaron, Solomon and the Queen of Sheba, or David playing his harp, and New Testament scenes and figures of the saints. There were also allegorical figures, such as Peace and Plenty or Faith and Hope, flora and fauna, and heraldic subjects. The use of portraits came into fashion in the 17th century. Initials and coats of arms were added to personalize the work."

The individual design elements consisted of purls, lizzarding, and spangles (now frequently called sequins). Purls are made from metal thread (usually silver or gold) that has been coiled into a tight spiral and sewn on top of the base fabric. Lizzarding is the process of attaching small pieces of metal to the base fabric with cross stitches.

== Materials ==
Embroidered bindings use one of three materials as the base for the design: satin, velvet, or canvas. Canvas covers are typically covered entirely by the embroidery. Satin and velvet covers usually allow some of the base material to show through, due to their decorative nature. Velvet bindings often featured embroidered appliqués, with little to no embroidery done on the velvet itself. "The cloth was embroidered separately before it was glued or stitched to the boards of a ready bound book; embroidered covers do not form part of the binding structure."

The type of threads used varies, but most covers use silk thread, gold thread, or silver thread. The silver and gold threads were made by twisting thin pieces of silver or gold around a strand of silk or flax.

== Image gallery ==
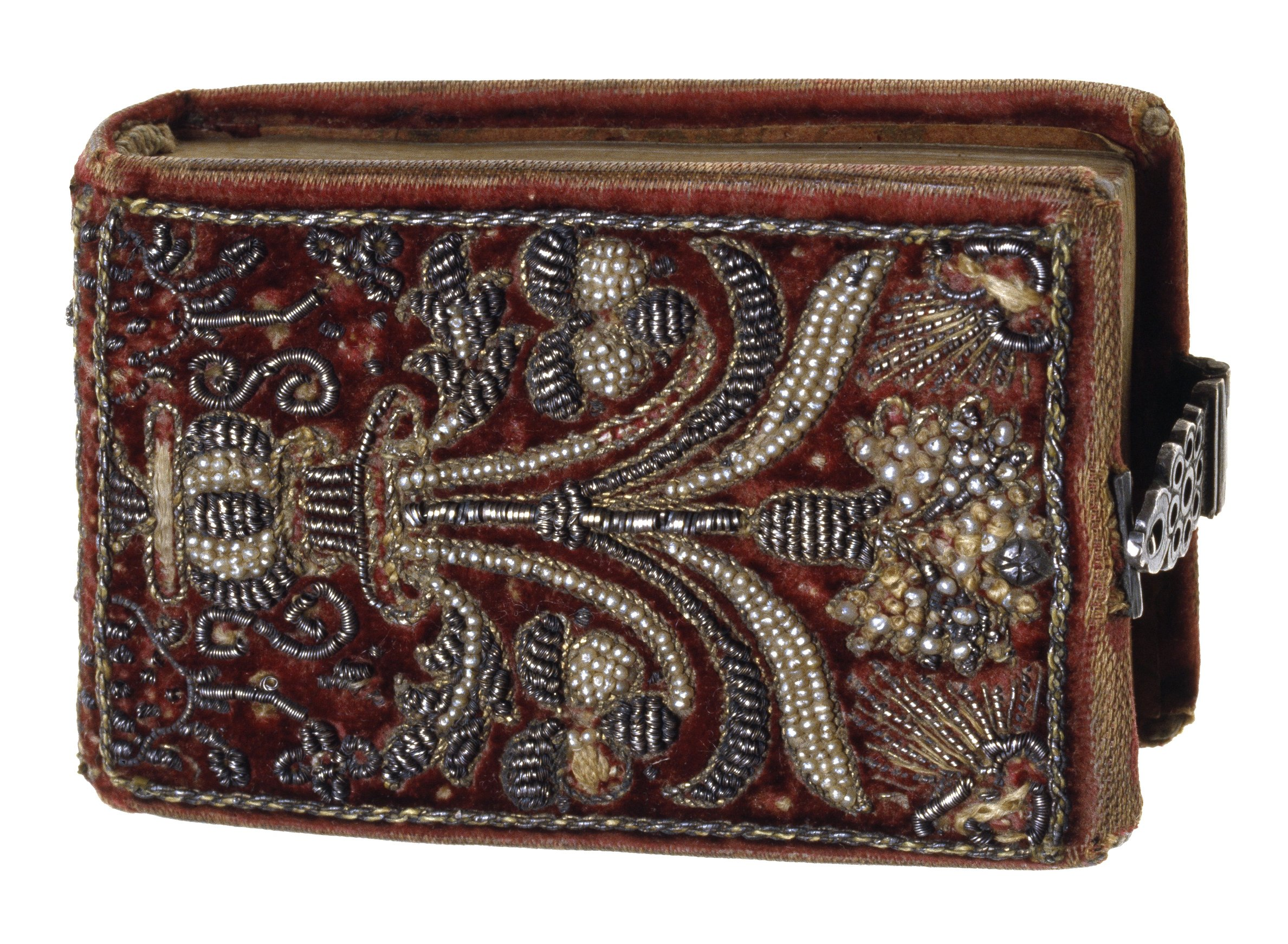
Folger Shakespeare Library's V.a.94. A velvet and embroidered binding by Esther Inglis (?), ca. 1608. Red velvet over pasteboard, decorated with silver thread embroidery and seed pearls. Silver clasp.

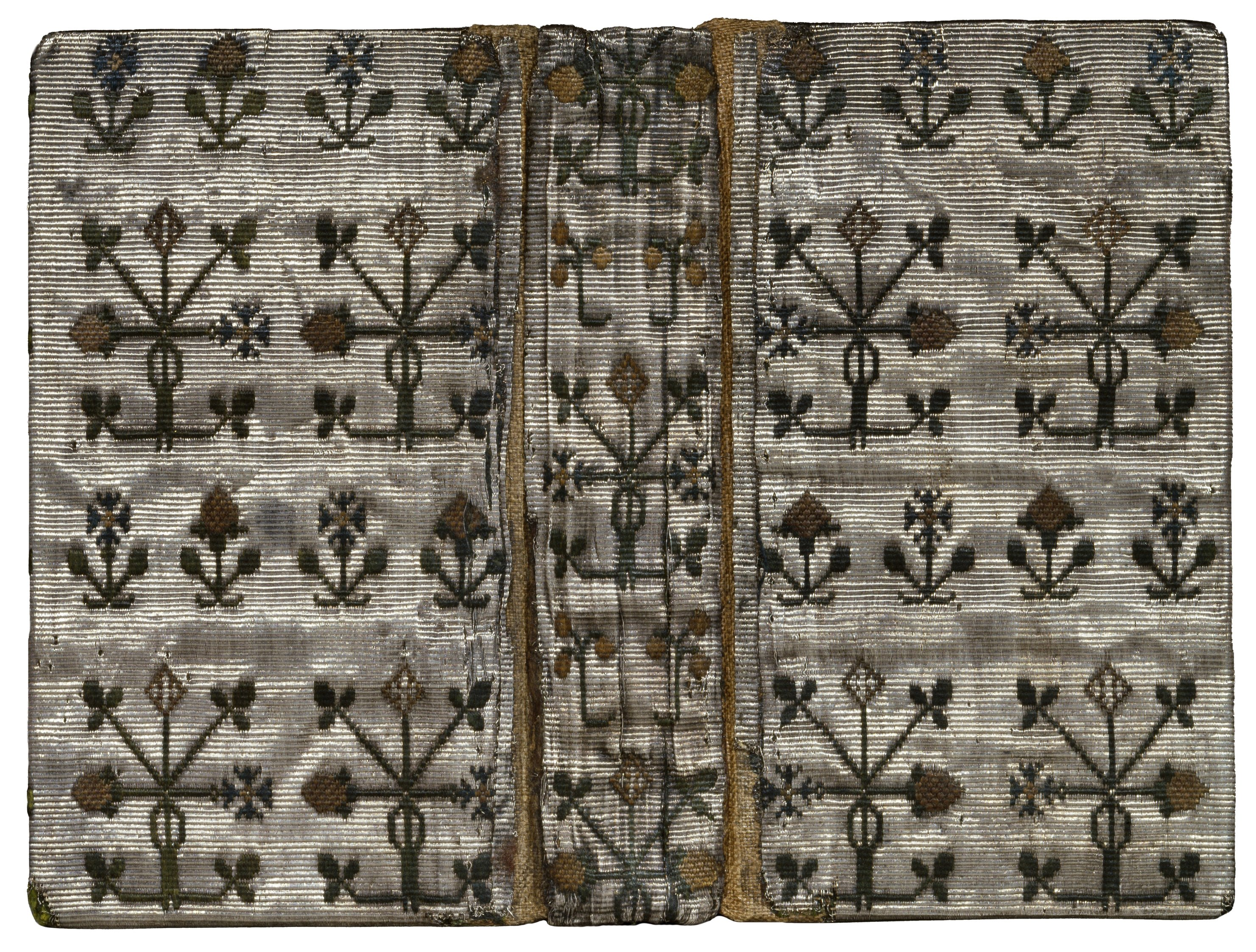
Folger Shakespeare Library's STC 11317. An English embroidered silver wire binding, ca. 1613. Woven silver wire over millboards with silk embroidery.

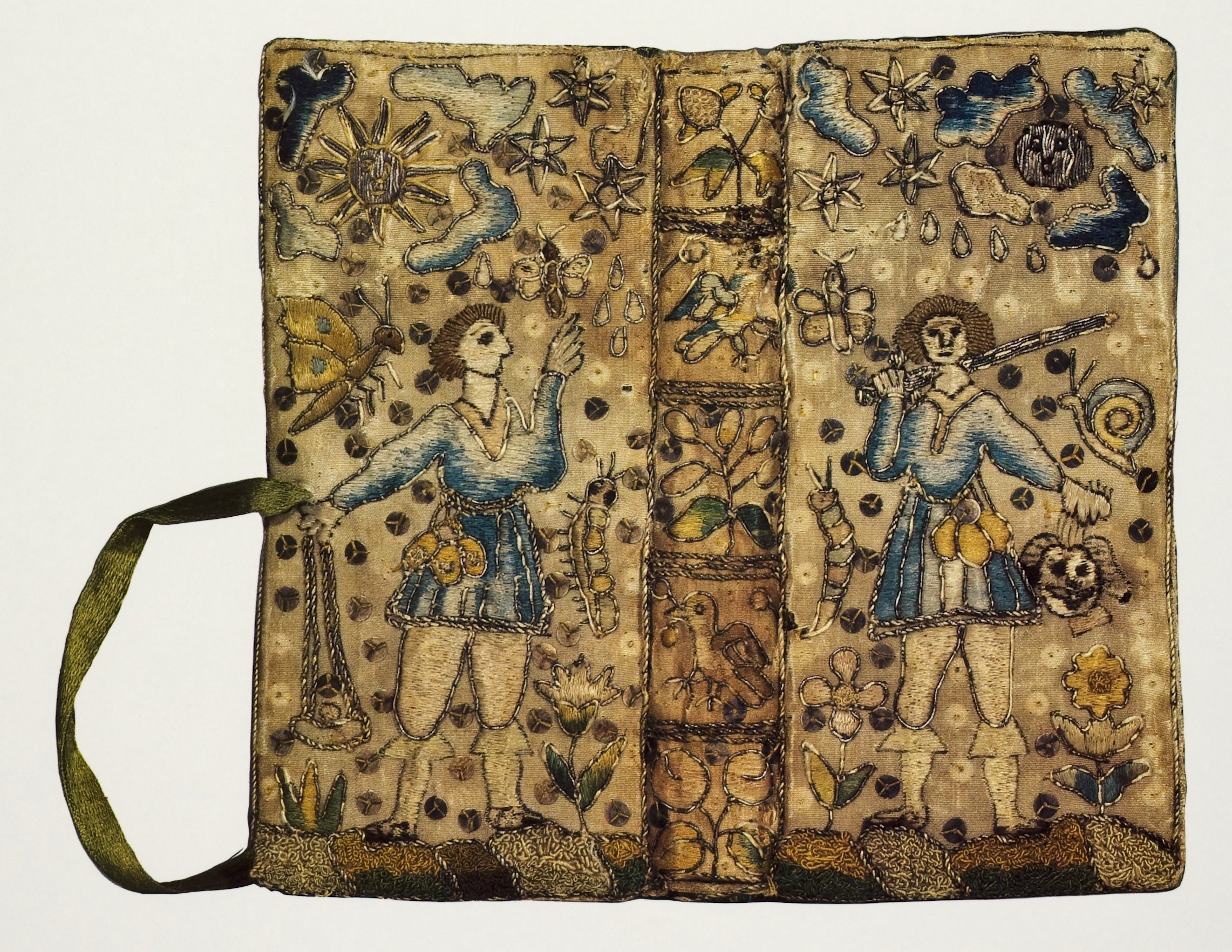
Folger Shakespeare Library's STC 2689 copy 1. A binding of embroidered white satin featuring David holding Goliath's head, ca. 1639. White satin over pasteboards, embroidered in colored silks and silver spangles.

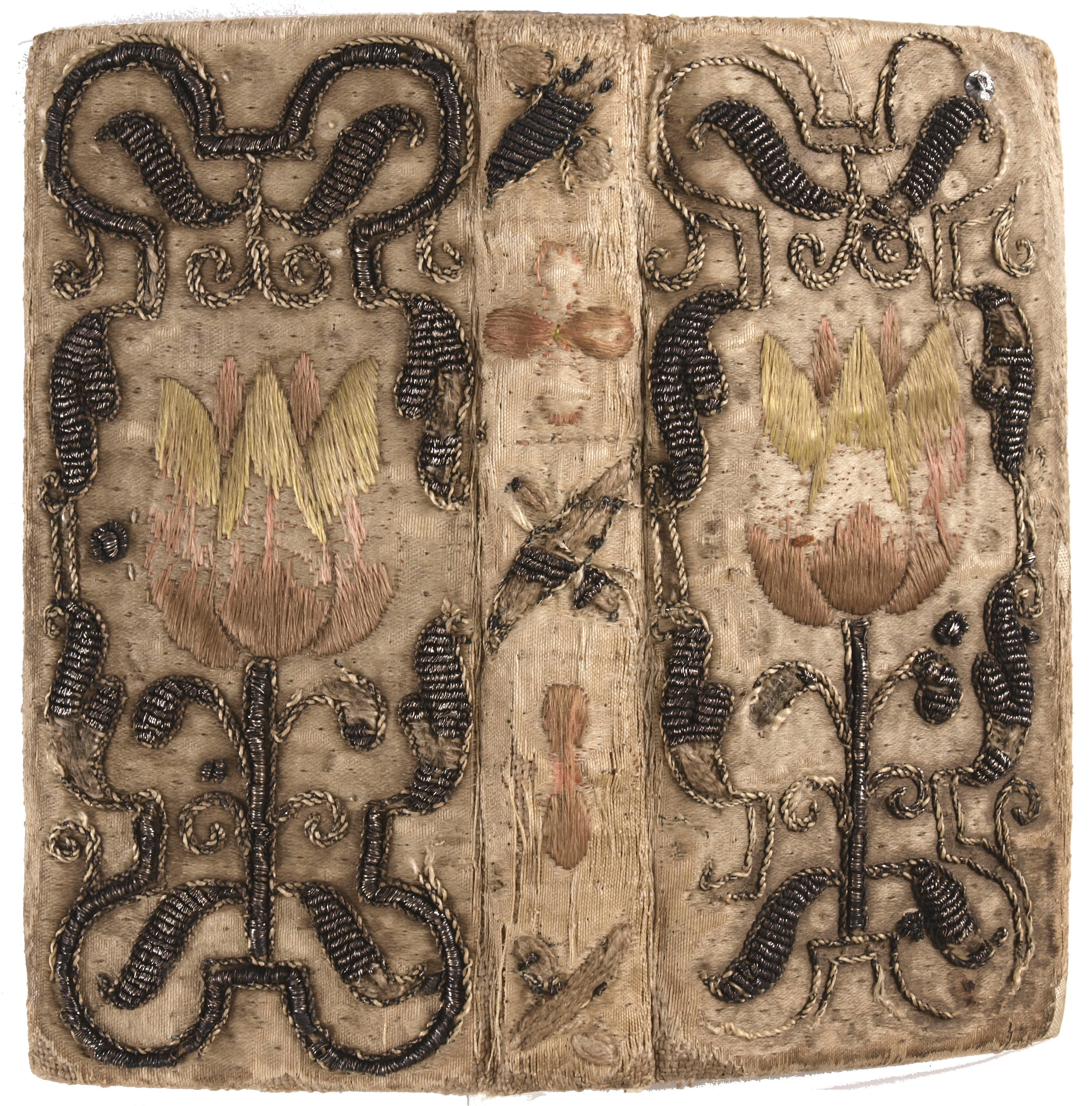
Folger Shakespeare Library's STC 2689 copy 2. Mid 17th-century English embroidered binding with floral bee design and gauffered edges.

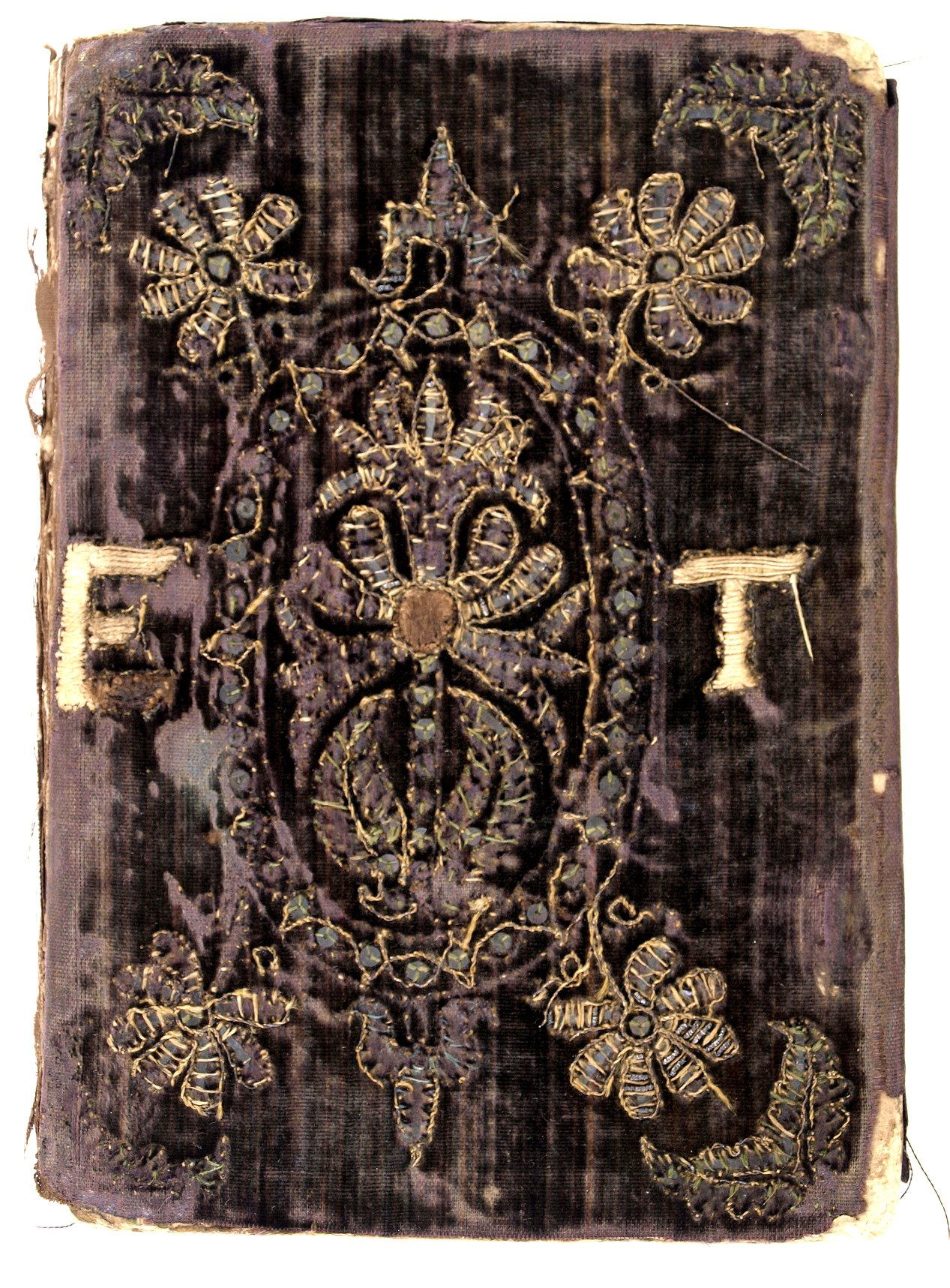
Folger Shakespeare Library's STC 23082 copy 6. Early 17th century English embroidered binding with initials.

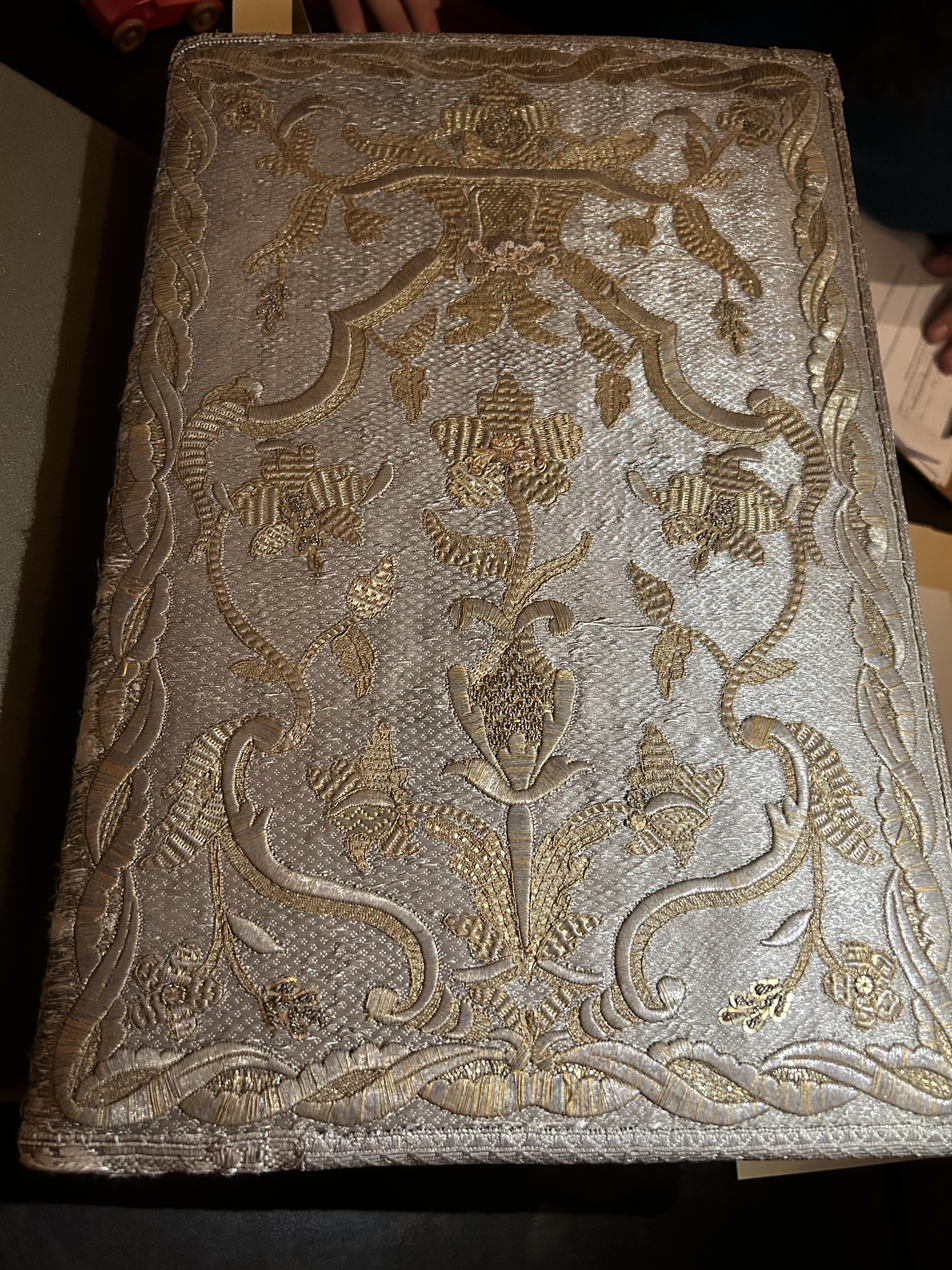
An edition of the Missale Romanum featuring a silver and gold embroidered cover. Printed by Nicolai Pezzana in Venice in 1716, exact date of binding unknown (after 1776). Book is currently housed at the Thomas Fisher Rare Book Library, University of Toronto.
