= John Jaffray (bookbinder) =

John Jaffray (31 October 1811 – 25 July 1869) was a London bookbinder who was active in the early Chartist movement and who assembled a large collection of literature and notes relating to the bookbinding trade. He arrived in London in about 1836. Jaffray was a member of the committee of the London Working Men's Association and a signatory to The People's Charter 1836, an important charter calling for greater political rights for the working classes that presaged the more well known People's Charter of 1838.

== The Jaffray Collection at the British Library ==
The Jaffray Collection in the British Library is a collection of manuscripts and ephemera relating to the art and trade of bookbinding collected principally by Jaffray. The collection includes scrapbooks, newspaper clippings, agendas of union meetings and ephemera including trade cards and advertisements. It also includes extensive information about trade societies for the bookbinding industry such as the Amicable Society of Bookbinders, the Bookbinders' Friendly Benefit Society, the Bookbinders' Pension Society and many other similar organisations. A number of industrial disputes are documented such as the 30-week dispute of 1839 over the use of apprentices.

The collection covers the period from the mid-1700s to the early 1910s but much of the early information must have been obtained second or third hand as it pre-dates Jaffray's life. It is believed that Jaffray relied heavily on William Hall, a journeyman bookbinder originally from Berwick-on-Tweed, who arrived in London in 1781 and first made contact with Jaffray in 1843. The collection was first examined in detail by Ellic Howe in about 1945 and it formed the basis for Howe and John Child's subsequent works.
