= Loose leaf =

Paper that is not bound in place

A loose leaf (also loose leaf paper, filler paper or refill paper) is a piece of paper of any kind that is not bound in place, or available on a continuous roll, and may be punched and organized as ring-bound (in a ring binder) or disc-bound. Loose leaf paper may be sold as free sheets, or made up into notepads, where perforations or glue allow them to be removed easily. "Leaf" in many languages refers to a sheet or page of paper, as in Folio, as in feuille de papier (French), hoja de papel (Spanish), foglio di carta (Italian), and ルーズリーフ (Japanese, /ruːzuriːfu/).

"Loose leaf" describes any kind of paper or book available in unbound single sheets. Its "leaves", or sheets, are "loose" and not bound in notebook or book form. In North America, some textbooks are sold with pre-punched holes and perforated pages, so users can remove the pages and store them in a typical 3-ring binder. This helps the user to carry only that portion of book they are currently using, and need not carry the whole book.

Main paper sizes are the letter-size system mainly used in North America and the ISO system used in the rest of the world. US companies such as Staples and Office Depot manufacture and sell letter-size loose leaf products in their retail stores. For ISO-sized loose leaf systems, since Japanese companies (e.g. Kokuyo, Maruman, MUJI, King Jim) are major designers and manufacturers of ISO-size loose leaf systems, whose products are sold internationally, corresponding Japanese terms will be included in parentheses throughout this article.

== Design ==
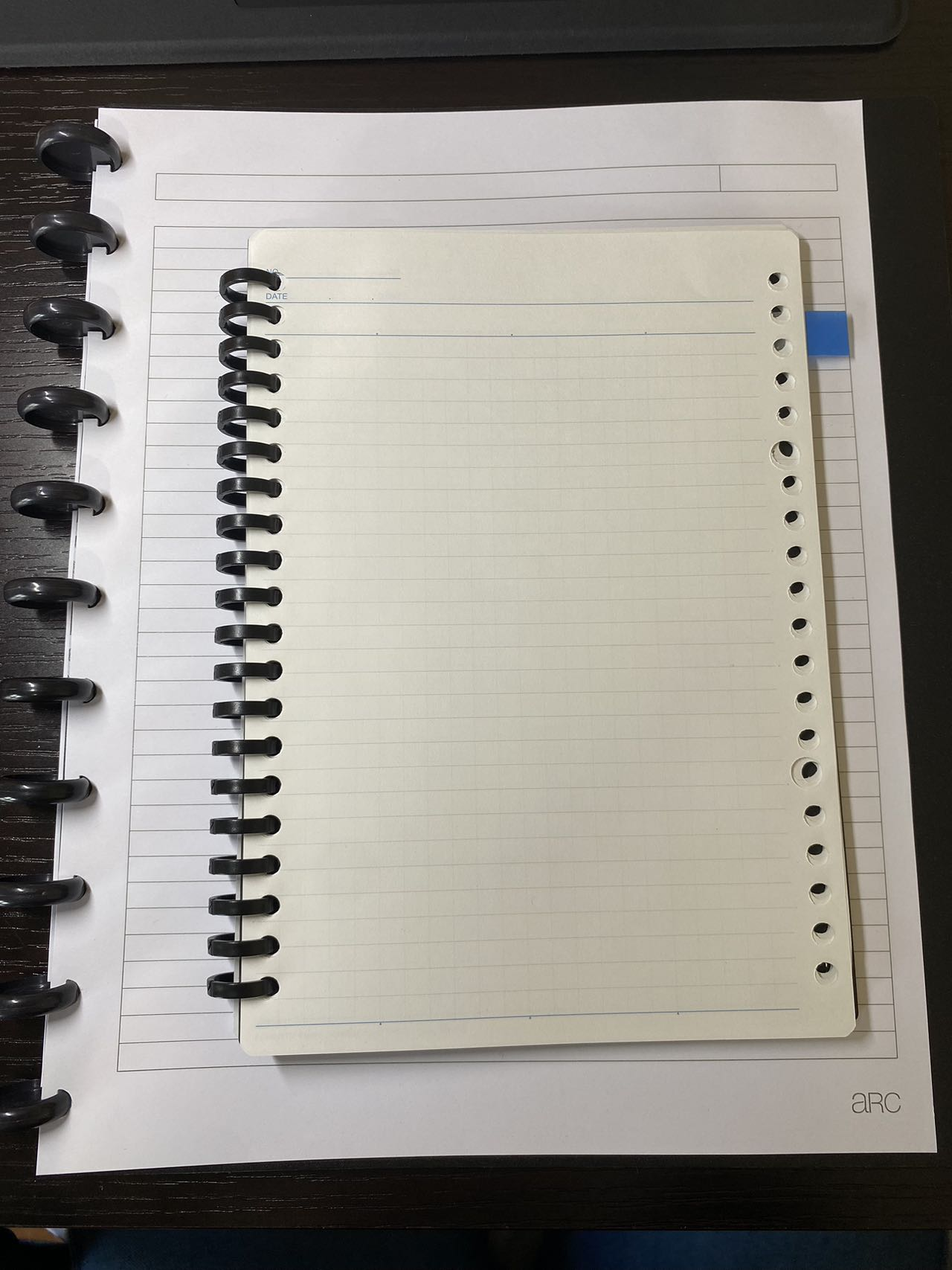
A (smaller, A5-size) binder and a (larger, letter-size) discbound notebook

=== Loose leaf systems ===
There are two main types of loose leaf systems:

- Binder-based loose leaf systems, which use a binder to hold pages. The binder is typically metal, but some slim binders (mainly manufactured by Japanese companies such as Kokuyo, MUJI and King Jim) may be plastic. In North America, 3-hole binders for letter-size papers typically have a width of 1/2 inch, 1 inch, 1.5 inches, 2 inches, 3 inches or 4 inches; in ISO system, binders typically have a width of less than 3 cm.
- “Discbound” loose leaf systems, which uses separate “discs” to hold covers and pages. Staples and Office Depot sell discbound notebooks with disc diameters of 3/4 inch, 1 inch and 1.5 inches; KW·TriO (可得优), a Chinese company, produces discbound notebooks whose disc diameters are 10mm, 15mm, 20mm and 25mm, whose products are also sold in India. (The hole thus punched for a discbound loose leaf system is called “香菇孔” (“mushroom hole”) by KW·TriO.)

A loose leaf system typically contains specially designed hole punches that can be used to punch holes on any common, standard-size paper so that they can be arranged into the loose leaf system. These hole punches are sold by the companies alongside their loose leaf binder or paper products, and usually there are third-party components for sale as well.

==== Orientation ====
Loose leaf systems may be “horizontal” or “vertical”. A “vertical” orientation has the punched holes along the longer side of the paper. Most loose leaf systems are vertical. Exceptions include Maruman's Mini (“ミニ”, of B7 size) binder system.

=== Loose leaf papers ===
There are four common types of loose leaves: (1) ruled paper (ja: 横罫. North American sizes include wide ruled, college ruled and narrow ruled, the line height of which are approximately 11/32, 9/32 and 1/4 inch (8.7, 7.1 and 6.4 mm), respectively, attending to different people's needs. In ISO loose leaf system, line height of 6mm, 7mm, 8mm and 10mm are common, typically simply referred to as “6mm罫”, “7mm罫” etc.), which may have “assistive (vertical) lines” (アシストライン), aiding in alignment across lines, (2) unruled (or "blank", 無地), (3) dotted (ja: ドット方眼) and (4) graph paper (or "grid paper", 方眼罫. In North American systems, the size of a grid is typically 1/4 inch (6.4 mm); in ISO system, it's typically 5 mm). College ruled paper has less space between the blue lines, allowing for more rows of writing. Wide ruled paper is intended for use by grade school children and those with larger handwriting.

Companies also sell pre-printed calendar loose leaves.

=== Accessories ===
- Card binder (for holding cards)
- Punched pocket (for inserting paper)
- Hole punch (for punching holes)
- Ruler (which can be attached or detached easily from the binder system)

=== Special functionalities ===
JL Darling produces waterproof Rite in the Rain loose-leaf paper for outdoor (e.g. field) purposes.

== Advantages and disadvantages ==
The chief advantage of loose-leaf paper is its flexibility and economy in use. A punched sheet of paper can be inserted into a ring binder, removed for separate use, and then returned to the binder. Different sheets can be organized into a different order in a binder, removed entirely and refiled in another binder, or disposed of as needed. This ability to rearrange and update the contents of binders is convenient for students and others, who can carry only those papers they are likely to need on a given day, while leaving the remainder elsewhere. The ability to add or remove an arbitrary number of pages is useful for reference works that are frequently updated, such as computer software manuals, parts catalogs, and legal indexes. Or it need not be bound at all and can stand on its own as a single paper.

The chief disadvantage of loose-leaf paper is that individual pages can be easily removed or lost from a storage binder due to tearing or wear of the punched holes. Adhesive reinforcement labels or sheet protectors are available to make pages more durable, and ring binders are often equipped with sheet lifters or other features to reduce wear and damage to their paper contents. Ring binders are sometimes banned from use for written journals, logs, or registers, which may even have pre-numbered permanently bound pages to discourage removal of pages, or at least allow a removal to be detected. Besides that, loose-leaf system may take up more space and be heavier compared to common glued or threadbound notebooks, due to the hinge (typically metal) involved.

== Loose leaves in countries that use Letter-sized papers ==
In U.S. and Canada, Letter-sized papers (8.5 x 11 inch) are used, and paper sizes are based on inches. The loose leaves in these countries have three punched holes on the left side of a paper, and the distance between two adjacent holes are set. The loose leaves may be exactly Letter-sized or smaller. Five Star sells Letter-sized loose leaves; Oxford and Mead sell 8 x 10.5 inch loose leaves. In libraries and print shops, hole punchers are regularly provided for punching 3 holes.

Some bound notebooks have perforated lines for tearing off pages, and all pages have pre-punched holes, so that when torn off, they can be organized into a binder directly.

=== Discbound loose leaf systems in North America ===
Staples and Office Depot produced "discbound" loose leaf systems: ARC and TUL, respectively, and sell them both in stores and online. Both are available in the US, while in Canada, mainly the Staples ARC system is available. These two systems sell products based on letter and junior (5.5 x 8.5 inch, which is half of letter size) sizes. They sell "narrow-ruled" (whose line height is approx. 6 mm or 1/4 inch) loose leaf paper, which is rare for 3-hole letter size papers. They sell "binding discs" of sizes of 1 inch and 1.5 inch. There are also third-party manufacturers of TUL system components.

Some smaller manufacturers also sell discbound systems. For example, Levenger sells a discbound system called "Circa" (the Levenger Circa® Notebook System).

== Loose leaves in countries that use ISO paper standards ==
In countries that use ISO paper standards (ISO 216), loose leaves of many different sizes are sold on the market.

Japan is a major designer and manufacturer of ISO-sized loose leaf systems, and their products are widely sold in east Asia, Europe and North America, especially through online resellers. Notable companies include Kokuyo, Maruman, MUJI, King Jim and Lihit Lab. MUJI has about 800 retail stores worldwide and sell their loose leaf system through their retail stores and online store.

=== Design ===
ISO loose leaf typically has these number of holes:

"Large-size multiple-hole loose-leaf paper"
| Paper size | Number of holes | Note |
|---|---|---|
| A4 | 30 | May have 4 extra-large holes for compatibility |
| B5 | 26 | May have 2 extra-large holes for compatibility |
| A5 | 20 | May have 2 extra-large holes for compatibility |

"4/6/9-hole loose-leaf paper"
| Paper size | Number of holes | Note |
|---|---|---|
| B5 | 9 | Three holes that go together are closer to each other, and each set of holes are distant from each other |
| A5 | 6 | Three holes that go together are closer to each other, and each set of holes are distant from each other. A5 has a size of 148x210mm. |
| A5 slim | 6 | Three holes that go together are closer to each other, and each set of holes are distant from each other. A5 slim has a size of 110x210mm. |
| B6 | 6 | Three holes that go together are closer to each other, and each set of holes are distant from each other. B6 has a size of 125x176mm. |
| A6 (A6PER or バイブル) | 6 | Three holes that go together are closer to each other, and each set of holes are distant from each other. バイブル stands for "Bible", and this size is also called "A6圣书" in Chinese. A6PER has a size of 95x170mm. |
| A6FC | 6 | Three holes that go together are closer to each other, and each set of holes are distant from each other. A6FC has a size of 105x170mm. |
| A6 narrow | 6 | Three holes that go together are closer to each other, and each set of holes are distant from each other. A6 narrow has a size of 80x170mm. |
| M6/A7 | 6 | M6 stands for "mini" 6 holes. The distances between all adjacent holes are the same. The width could be 76 mm or 80 mm, and the height could be 120 mm or 126 mm depending on the manufacturer |
| M5/A8 | 5 | M5 stands for "mini" 5 holes. The distances between all adjacent holes are the same. The height is 105 mm and width could be 62 mm, 67 mm or 74 mm depending on the manufacturer |

For A6 and B6, there are typically "slim" (ja: スリム, surimu) versions as well.

"Small-size multiple-hole loose-leaf paper"
| Paper size | Number of holes | Note |
|---|---|---|
| A7 semi | 7 | This is a steno-pad-style loose leaf system developed by Kokuyo and sold in China. The paper size is 110x71mm. |
| B7 mini (ミニ) | 9 | This is a landscape-style loose leaf system developed by Maruman and sold in Japan and China. The paper size is 86x128mm. |

==== Width of ruled lines ====
The most common widths of ruled lines are 6mm, 7mm and 8mm. Some manufacturers sell 9mm and 10mm ruled paper as well, to accommodate special needs related to writing CJK characters, which takes up more space than alphabet-based scripts.

==== Grid and dotted loose leaf papers ====
The most common grid size is 5 mm, while manufacturers such as MUJI sell grid loose leaf papers of 2 mm and other grid sizes as well.

The most common dot width is 5 mm.

==== Accessories ====
Many accessories are on the market, including punched zipper storage bag, punched "today"-ruler, card organizer, etc.

=== Different countries/regions ===
ISO-sized loose leaves are most often designed and manufactured in Japan, mainland China and Taiwan.

==== Japan ====
Japan is a major contributor to the market of ISO-sized loose leaves. In Japan, sizes of loose leaves such as A4, B5, A5, A6, A7 and special sizes such as "bible size / diary size" (e.g. by Raymay DaVinci) and are sold. Notable Japanese manufacturers include Kokuyo Co., Ltd. (コクヨ) and Maruman Co. Ltd. (マルマン (文具)).

Kokuyo's products sell internationally and are available in the Chinese, European and North American markets as well.

MUJI (無印良品, see 良品計画) has retail stores worldwide, selling products including ISO-sized loose leaf paper, even in North America where ISO sizes are not commonly used.

Both Kokuyo and Maruman manufacture pre-printed calendar loose leaf packages sold for one calendar year.

Kokuyo's loose leaves are sold all over the world, and can be found in North American and European markets.

Lihit Lab (リヒトラブ) produces a special type of loose leaf, with rectangular holes (instead of round ones) with non-standard spacings. Lihit Lab sells special ring binders to fit its loose leaves.

Maruman manufactures and sells a special size called Mini B7 (ミニ size, 86 x 128 mm).

==== Mainland China ====
Many loose leaf products are imported from Japan to mainland China. Kokuyo sells Chinese market-specific versions of pre-printed calendar loose leaf packages.

==== Taiwan ====
SEASON (四季纸品礼品) is a major manufacturer of different sizes of loose leaves in Taiwan.

== History ==
Two early applications of looseleaf binding were Nelson's Perpetual Loose Leaf Encyclopaedia (1907) and legal textbooks updated through a looseleaf service (1914).

== See also ==
- Ring binder
- Hole punch
- Paper size
- Ruled paper
- Genkō yōshi
- Graph paper
- Post-it note
- Bookbinding
- Notebook
- Index card
