= Stanford Encyclopedia of Philosophy =

Online philosophy encyclopedia and collection of peer-reviewed papers

- Website type: Online encyclopedia of philosophy
- Owners: The Metaphysics Research Lab, Center for the Study of Language and Information, Stanford University
- Creator: Edward N. Zalta
- Editors: Edward N. Zalta; Uri Nodelman
- Website: plato.stanford.edu
- Launched: 1995; 31 years ago
- ISSN: 1095-5054
- OCLC number: 643092515

The Stanford Encyclopedia of Philosophy (SEP) is a free online philosophy resource published and maintained by Stanford University, encompassing both an online encyclopedia of philosophy and peer-reviewed original publication. Each entry is written and maintained by an expert in the field, including professors from many academic institutions worldwide. Authors contributing to the encyclopedia give Stanford University the permission to publish the articles, but retain the copyright to those articles.

== Approach and history ==
As of August 5, 2022, the SEP has 1,774 published entries. Apart from its online status, the encyclopedia uses the traditional academic approach of most encyclopedias and academic journals to achieve quality by means of specialist authors selected by an editor or an editorial committee that is competent (although not necessarily considered specialists) in the field covered by the encyclopedia and peer review.

The encyclopedia was created in 1995 by Edward N. Zalta, with the explicit aim of providing a dynamic encyclopedia that is updated regularly, and so does not become dated in the manner of conventional print encyclopedias.

The charter for the encyclopedia allows for rival articles on a single topic to reflect reasoned disagreements among scholars.

Initially, the SEP was developed with U.S. public funding from the National Endowment for the Humanities and the National Science Foundation. A long-term fundraising plan to preserve open access to the encyclopedia is supported by many university libraries and library consortia. These institutions contribute under a plan devised by the SEP in collaboration with the Scholarly Publishing and Academic Resources Coalition, the International Coalition of Library Consortia, and the Southeastern Library Network, with matching funding from the National Endowment for the Humanities.

The logo depicts the initials of SEP in the shape of The Thinker, an original copy of which is co-owned by Stanford and which features across the university's iconography and culture.

== See also ==
- Encyclopedia of Philosophy
- Internet Encyclopedia of Philosophy
- Nelson's Perpetual Loose Leaf Encyclopaedia
- Routledge Encyclopedia of Philosophy
- List of online encyclopedias
