= Perforation =

(Making) a small hole in a thin material

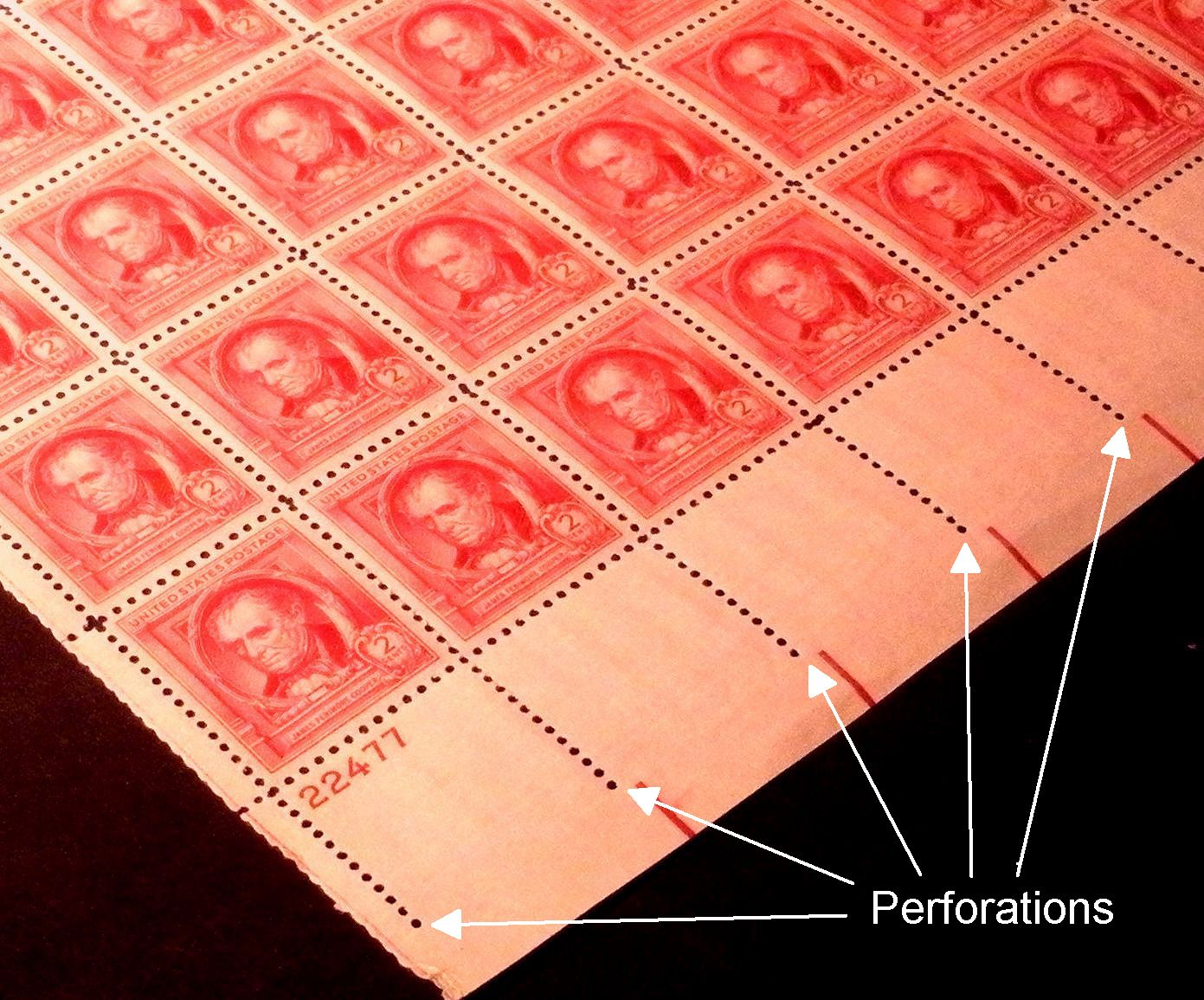
A partial image of a sheet of US Postage stamps, 1940 issue, featuring perforations

A perforation is a small hole in a thin material or web. There is usually more than one perforation in an organized fashion, where all of the holes collectively are called a perforation. The process of creating perforations is called perforating, which involves removing bits of the workpiece with a tool. Old-fashioned lick-and-stick postage stamps are perforated. When a tool makes small cuts in the material (without removing anything) it is called 'rouletting', because that tool often resembles a roulette wheel, with blades around the edge. Raffle tickets are a good example of rouletting.

Perforations are usually used to allow easy separation of two sections of the material, such as allowing paper to be torn easily along the line. Packaging with perforations in paperboard or plastic film is easy for consumers to open. Other purposes include filtrating fluids, sound deadening, allowing light or fluids to pass through, and to create an aesthetic design.

Various applications include plastic films to allow the packages to breathe, medical films, micro perforated plate and sound and vapor barriers.

In philatelic studies and in the identification of stamps by collectors, a perforation gauge is used to measure the perforations in each 2 cm.

== Processes ==
=== Pins and needles ===
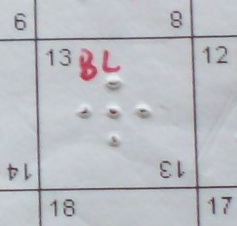
"Volcanic" perforations made with a needle punch

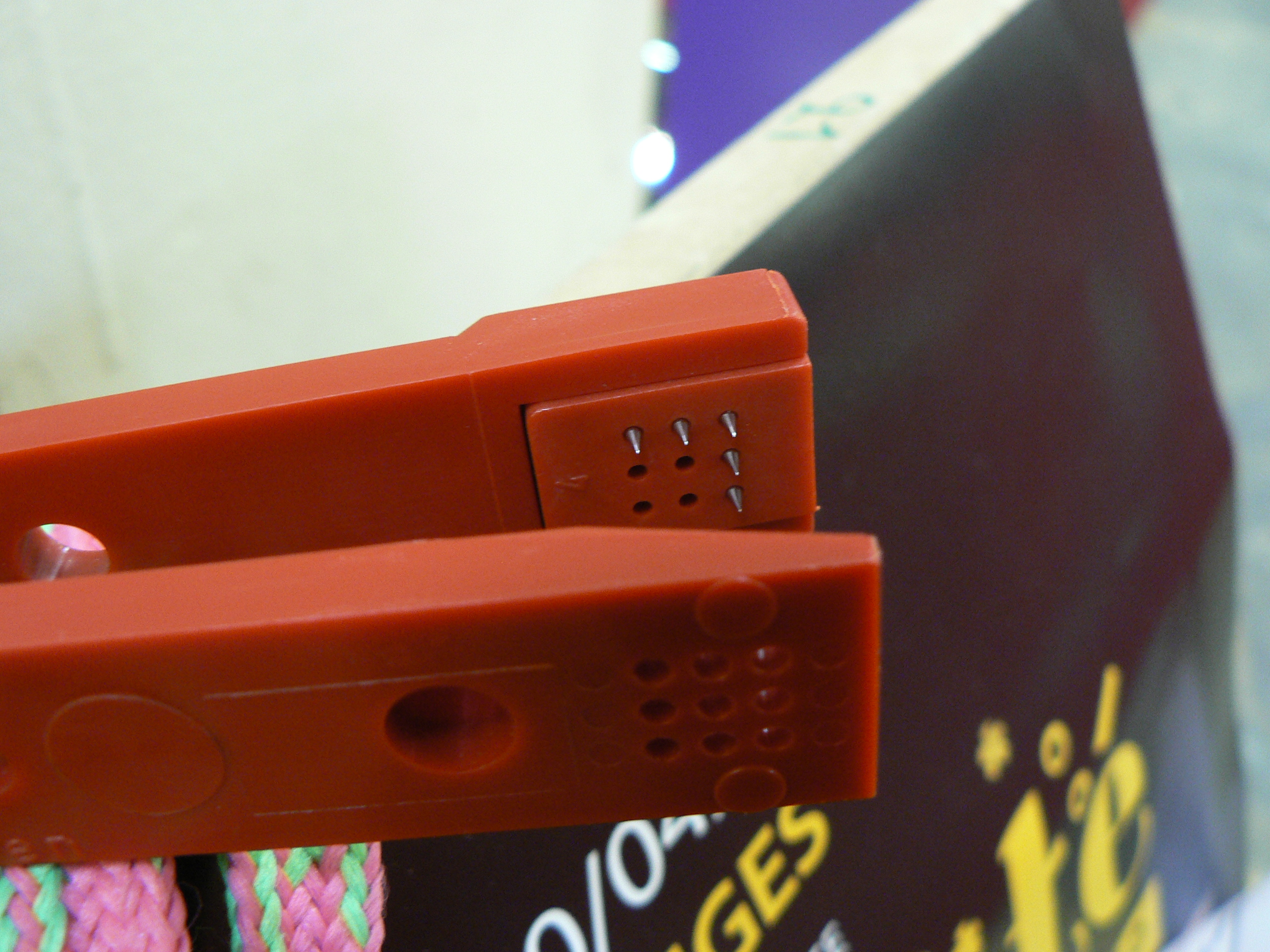
A needle punch used in orienteering

Rotary pinned perforation rollers are precision tools that can be used to perforate a wide variety of materials. The pins or needles can be used cold or heated. Cold perforation tools include needle punches.

There are a handful of manufacturers that specialize in hot and cold needle perforation tooling and equipment. In materials that have elasticity this can result in a "volcano" hole that is preferred in many applications.

Pinned rollers can be made from a variety of materials, including plastic, steel, and aluminum.

In more brittle films, cold perforation can cause slitting rather than creating a round hole, which can jeopardize the material's integrity under pressure. The solution to this is often heating the pin; i.e. hot pin perforation. Hot perforation melts a hole in the material, causing a reinforced ring around the hole. Hot needle perforation also assists when high density pin patterns are utilized, as the heat aids the perforation of the material.

=== Die and punch ===
Die and punch sets can be used for thicker materials or materials that require large holes; this process is the most common for metalworking. The workpiece is sheared by pressing (either by machine or hand tool) the punch through the workpiece and into the die. The middle section of the workpiece is scrap; commonly known as the chad in paper and similar materials. The punch and die are shaped to produce the desired shaped hole. The clearance (the distance between the outside circumference of the punch and the inner circumference of the die) must be properly maintained to ensure a clean cut. Burrs are produced on the side of the workpiece that is against the die.

Common applications are fruit and vegetable bags, hole punching and ticket punching. The same perforation technology is also used in Booklet For Packaging products to create easy-tear sections, inserts, and informational packaging components.

=== Laser perforation ===
Laser cutting can place many precise holes in a web. Laser perforations look similar in many respects to hot needle perforations. However, laser systems are expensive. The big advantage of laser perforation is the consistency of the hole size, compared to mechanical perforation. This is very important in modified atmosphere packaging for fresh produce. The laser perforation is often carried out on roll slitting machines (slitter rewinder) as the printed material is slit down to the finished roll size.

== Applications ==
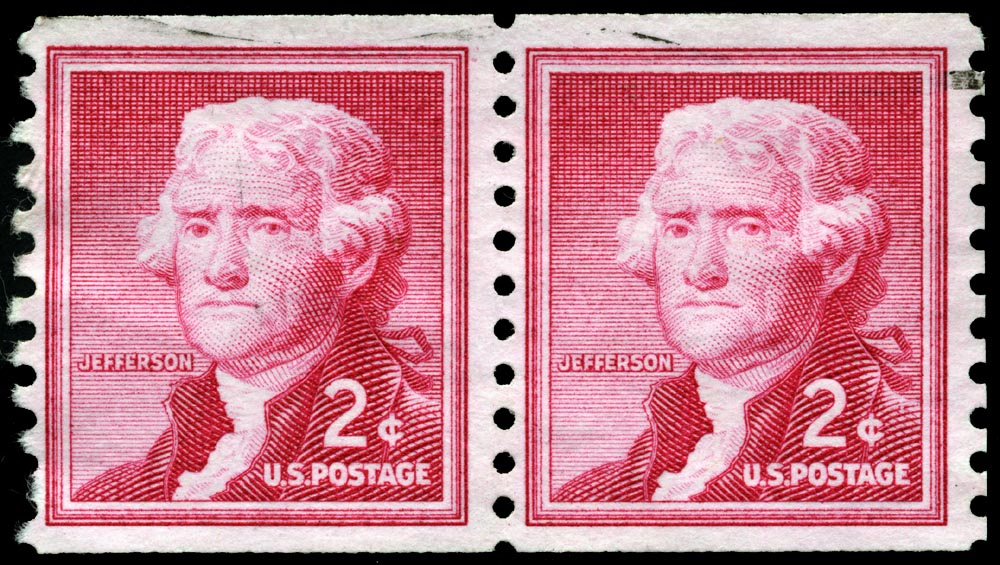
Perforation holes on a pair of coil stamps

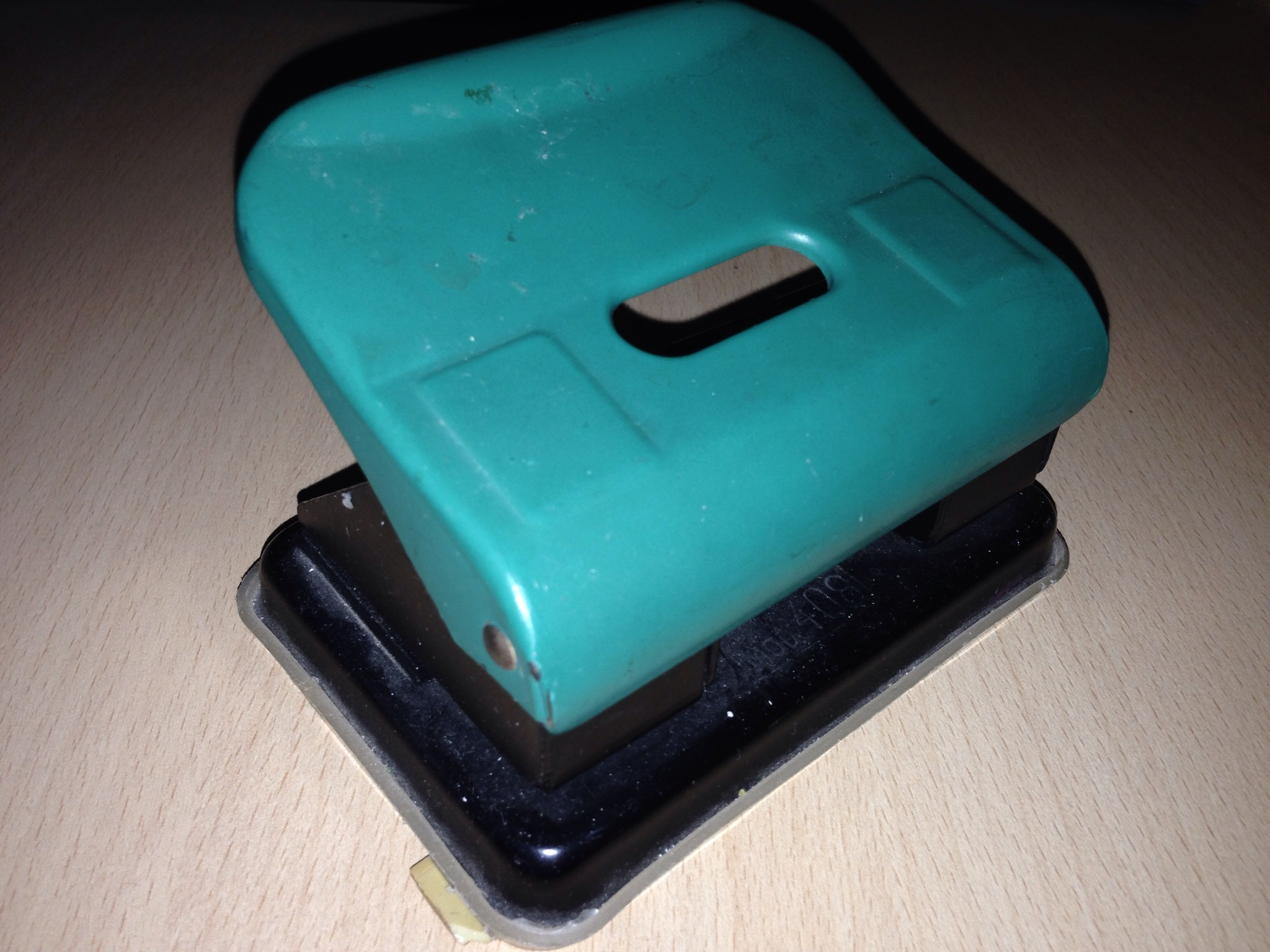
Paper perforator

Perforation frequently refers to the practice of creating a long series of holes or slits so that paper or plastics can be torn more easily along a given line: this is used in easy-open packaging. Since the creation of perforation devices in the 1840s and 1850s, it has seen use in several areas.

Postage stamps are one common application of this, where small round holes are cut in lines to create individual pieces. Perforations on stamps are rather large, in the order of a millimeter, in comparison other perforated materials often have smaller holes.

It is common for cheque-books, notebooks and legal pads to have perforations making it easier to tear out individual pages or leaves. Perforation is used in ways to separate loose leaf (or even a form of graph paper from a ringed binder). A fine perforation next to the rings allows the page to be separated from the book with no confetti.

Screwcaps on glass or plastic bottles are sealed with a ring at the bottom of the cap attached by perforation. Twisting the cap has the effect of rupturing the material between the perforations and indicating that the original seal has been broken.

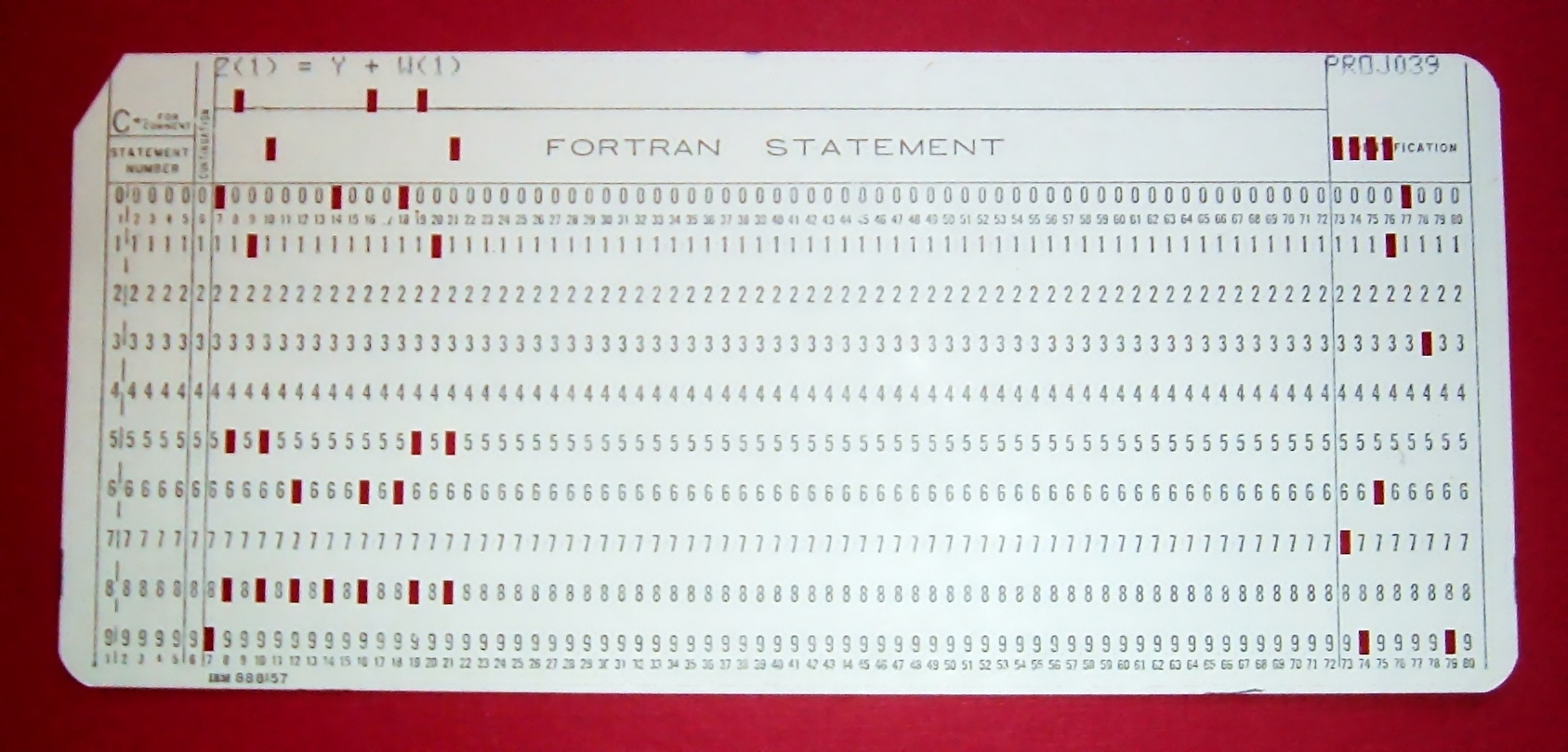
Perforated punch card

The edges of film stock are perforated to allow it to be moved precise distances at a time continuously. Similarly, punched cards for use in looms and later in computers input and output devices in some cases were perforated to ensure correct positioning of the card in the device, and to encode information.

Perforation of steel strips is used in the manufacture of some zesters and rasps.

Historically, perforation patterns other than linear were used to mark stamps. A series of patents had been issued in the late 19th century for perforation machines to be used on rail lines for ticketing. Libraries and private collections used similar perforating stamps to mark ownership of books. End sheets, title pages, and image plates were punched with the namesake of the collection. Today, similarly elaborate perforation patterns continue to be used in orienteering.

Bread bags for some bread often have micro-perforations in the plastic, which is supposed to keep the bread fresh by releasing excess moisture. Similarly, bags of concrete use small perforations to allow air to escape while they are being filled.

== See also ==
- Film perforations
- Punched tape
