= Exercise book =

Type of notebook used in schools

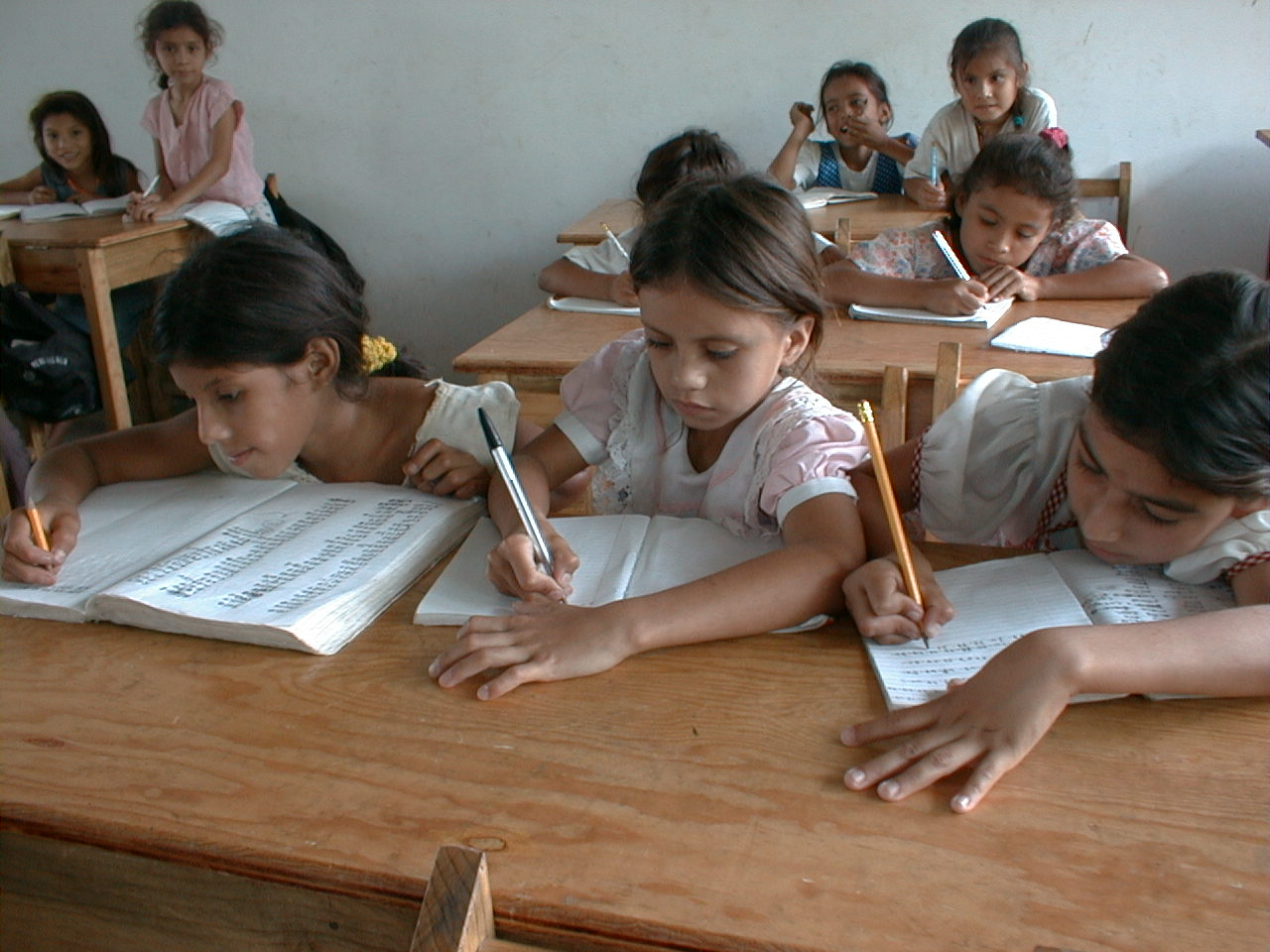
Children writing in exercise books

A common exercise book

An exercise book is a notebook that is used in schools to copy down schoolwork and notes. A student will usually have different exercise books for each separate lesson or subject.

The exercise book format is different for some subjects: for the majority of subjects, the exercise book will contain lined paper with a margin, but for other subjects such as mathematics, the exercise book will contain squared paper to aid in the drawing of graphs, tables or other diagrams.

Exercise books may act as a primary record of students' learning efforts. For younger pupils, books are often collected at the end of each lesson for review, scoring, or grading. Loose worksheets may be pasted into the book so that they are bound with other work.

In some schools, exercise books may be colour-coded depending on the subject. For example, biology might be green and algebra blue.

The exercise book was also called version book historically, and is called khata in India, scribbler in Canada, jotter in Scotland, and copy book in Ireland and the United Kingdom. The US equivalent is composition book, which traditionally has a distinctive cover pattern.

== Size ==
=== Australia ===
The traditional size of a school exercise book in Australia is 7 by 9 inches (180 mm × 230 mm), which may be approximated by B5 (176 × 250 mm). Larger A4 (previously foolscap) notebooks are also very commonly used.

=== Czech Republic and Slovakia ===
Exercise books manufactured in the Czech Republic and Slovakia are labeled by three-digit codes that encode their size, number of pages, and ruling.

The first numeral stands for the size:

- 4 for A4 paper
- 5 for A5 paper
- 6 for A6 paper

The second numeral stands for the number of pages:

- 1 for 10 pages
- 2 for 20 pages
- 4 for 40 pages
- 6 for 60 pages
- 8 for 80 pages

The third numeral stands for the ruling:

- 0 for blank exercise book
- 1 for lined paper—lines at 20 mm
- 2 for lined paper—lines at 16 mm
- 3 for lined paper—lines at 12 mm
- 4 for lined paper—lines at 8 mm
- 5 for squared paper—squares are 5 x 5 mm
- 10 for squared paper—squares are 10 x 10 mm

=== Ireland ===
Copy books sold in Ireland usually come with 32, 40, 88, or 120 pages. The pages can be blank, ruled, and/or squared.

=== New Zealand ===
School exercise books in New Zealand generally conform to standard NZS 8132:1984 (Specification for school stationery). An alphanumeric code is used to describe the exercise book's binding, format, and size.

The first numerals(s) refer to the binding:

- 1 for softcover
- 2 for hardcover
- 8 for spiral bound

The letter refers to the format:

- A for unruled
- B for 7 mm ruled
- I for 9 mm ruled
- F for 12 mm ruled
- L for alternating pages unruled and 7 mm ruled
- J for 5 mm quad
- E for 7 mm quad
- H for 10 mm quad

The last numeral refers to the size:

- 4 for 230 mm × 180 mm (9.1 in × 7.1 in)
- 5 for 255 mm × 205 mm (10.0 in × 8.1 in)
- 8 for 297 mm × 210 mm (11.7 in × 8.3 in) (A4 size)

=== Russia ===
The most common Russian exercise notebooks, codified in the Russian industry standard, are:

- A "thin" notebook (Russian: школьная тетрадь, school notebook) with 12, 18, or 24 sheets, having size 170 x 205 mm. They are stapled through the fold, which, aided by their thinness, allows to open them completely flat, simplifying writing on the left side. These notebooks are used for daily work in primary school like teaching penmanship and arithmetic, and are often collected for review and grading. These notebooks are called copybooks at English language lessons in Russian schools.
- A "thick" notebook (Russian: общая тетрадь, general-use notebook) with more than 24 sheets and up to 96 sheets, having width at least 144 mm and height no more than 297 mm (same height as A4 paper size). These notebooks are intended for usage in middle and high school for tasks like lesson notes, long-term projects, essays, laboratory experiments, etc.

Other sizes and number of sheets are permitted. The preferable sizes are (in mm): 210 x 297 (A4), 203 x 288, 203 x 275, 170 x 203, 148 x 210 (A5), 144 x 203.

"Thin" notebooks must be either ruled with 8 mm spacing between the lines, or graph-ruled with 5 mm or 7 mm squares. "Thick" notebooks must be either ruled with 6 mm, 7 mm, 8 mm, 9 mm spacing between the lines, or graph-ruled with 3 mm, 4 mm, 5 mm, 6 mm, or 7 mm squares.

The paper for cursive writing uses pairs of lines 4 mm apart, with 8 mm between the pairs. They may also have angled lines at 65 degrees to vertical to provide additional guidance.

The lines can have gray, blue, green, or purple colour. The vertical margin line must have a red or orange color. Vertical margin is optional for graph-ruled notebooks.

=== United Kingdom ===
There are three commonly used sizes of exercise book (or copy book) in the UK: A5 (148×210 mm), A4 (210×297 mm), and 178×229 mm (approximately 7″×9″, based on a traditional size used before the UK adopted ISO 216 paper sizes). They usually come with 32, 48, 64, or 80 pages which can be plain, ruled, or squared.

In Scotland, exercise books are commonly known as "jotters".

=== United States ===
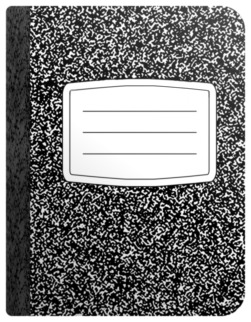
A composition book sporting the common black-and-white pattern.

In the United States, exercise books used by writers and students are known as composition books. Although available in several colors, the original marbled black-and-white cover, with its generic label on the front, is the most common. Typically, they have dimensions of 9 3/4 by 7 1/2 inches (250 mm × 190 mm) or 8 1/2 by 6 7/8 inches (220 mm × 170 mm) and 20, 40, 80 or 100 sheets.

Composition books can be ruled or graphed.

The papers in a composition book often have the baseline and cap line printed in blue to aid writing, with a (sometimes red) vertical line for a margin on the left hand of every page. Traditionally, the inside back cover contains a table of the weights and measures of the English (imperial) system printed for reference; however, this feature has become less common in countries that have adopted the metric system. Sometimes a multiplication table, or grammar or punctuation tips, are also found on the inside back cover. The inside front cover typically has a place to put one's weekly class schedule.

Composition books are traditionally bound through the fold—that is, the pages are folded, and stitched vertically along the fold. This allows to open them completely flat, simplifying writing on the left side, and also makes them significantly more durable than loose leaf pads or spiral notebooks.

Exercise books with fewer sheets, such as Blue books, are used in many post-secondary schools during assessment tests.

== Examples ==
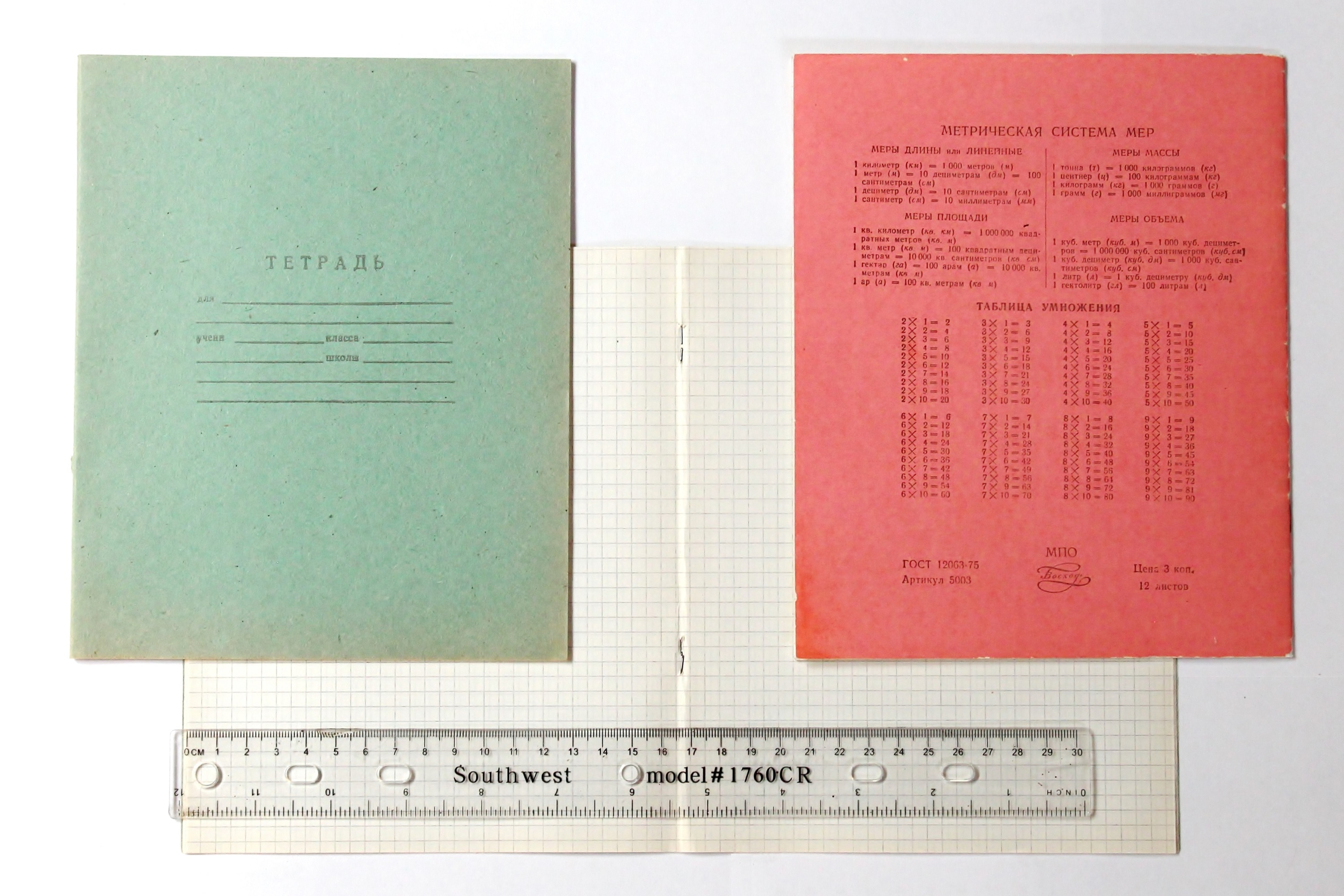
Squared 12-sheet and 18-sheet exercise books used in Russian primary schools

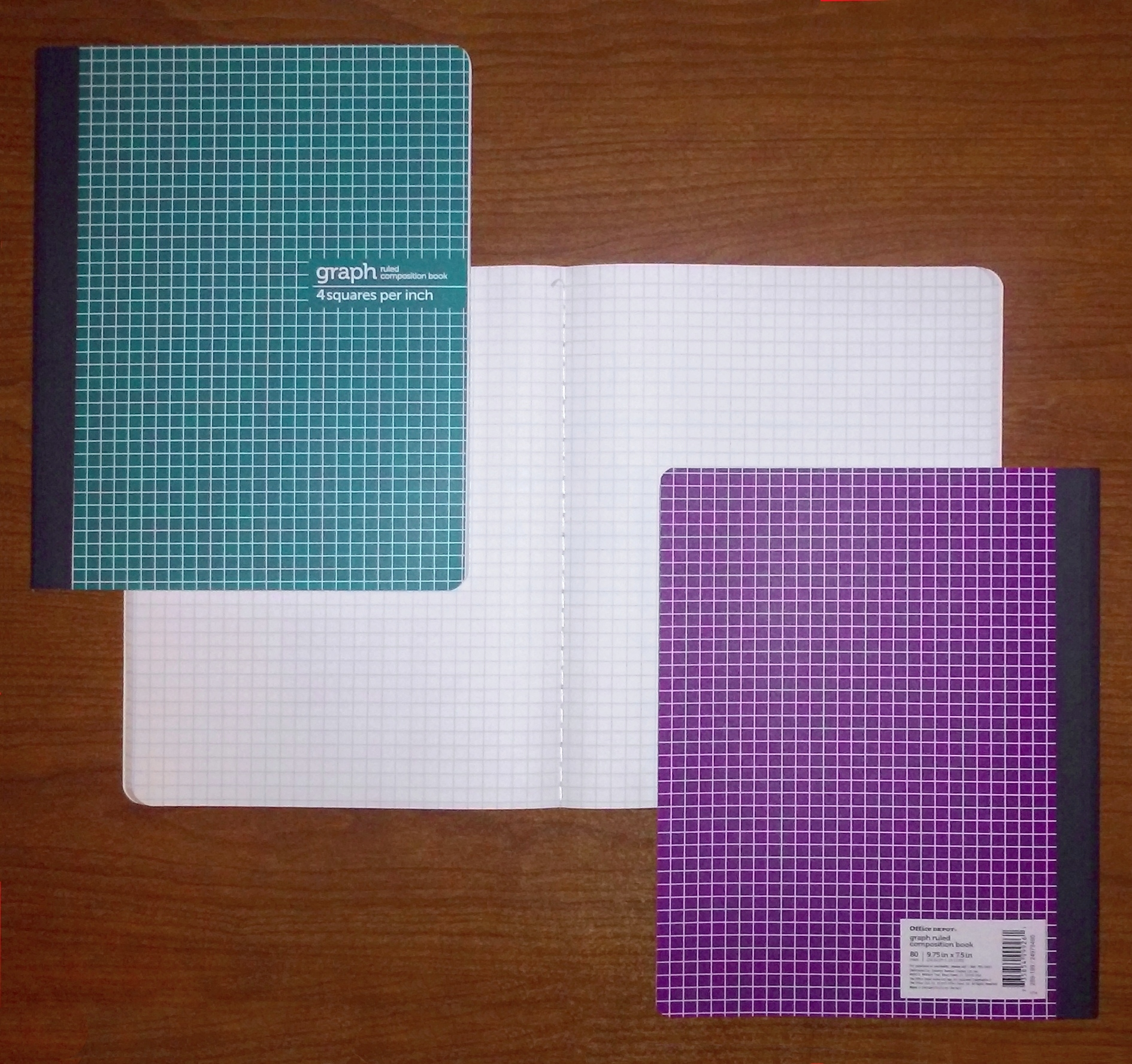
Graph-ruled composition book used in the United States

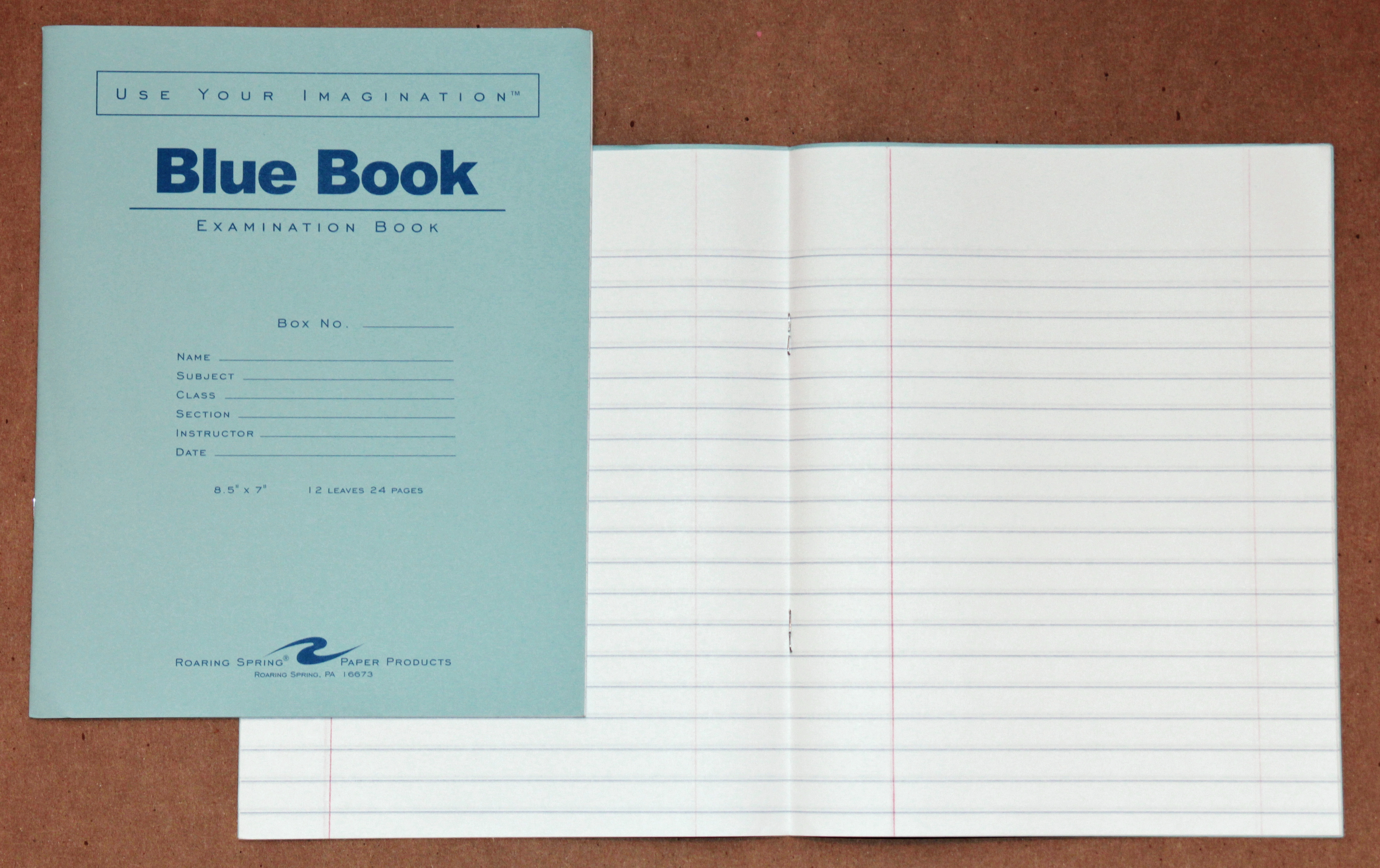
A 12-sheet Blue book used in many post-secondary schools in the United States

== See also ==
- Notebook
- Ruled paper
- Graph paper
- Copybook
- Examination book
- Laboratory notebook
