= Examination book =

Notebook used for writing answers to an examination

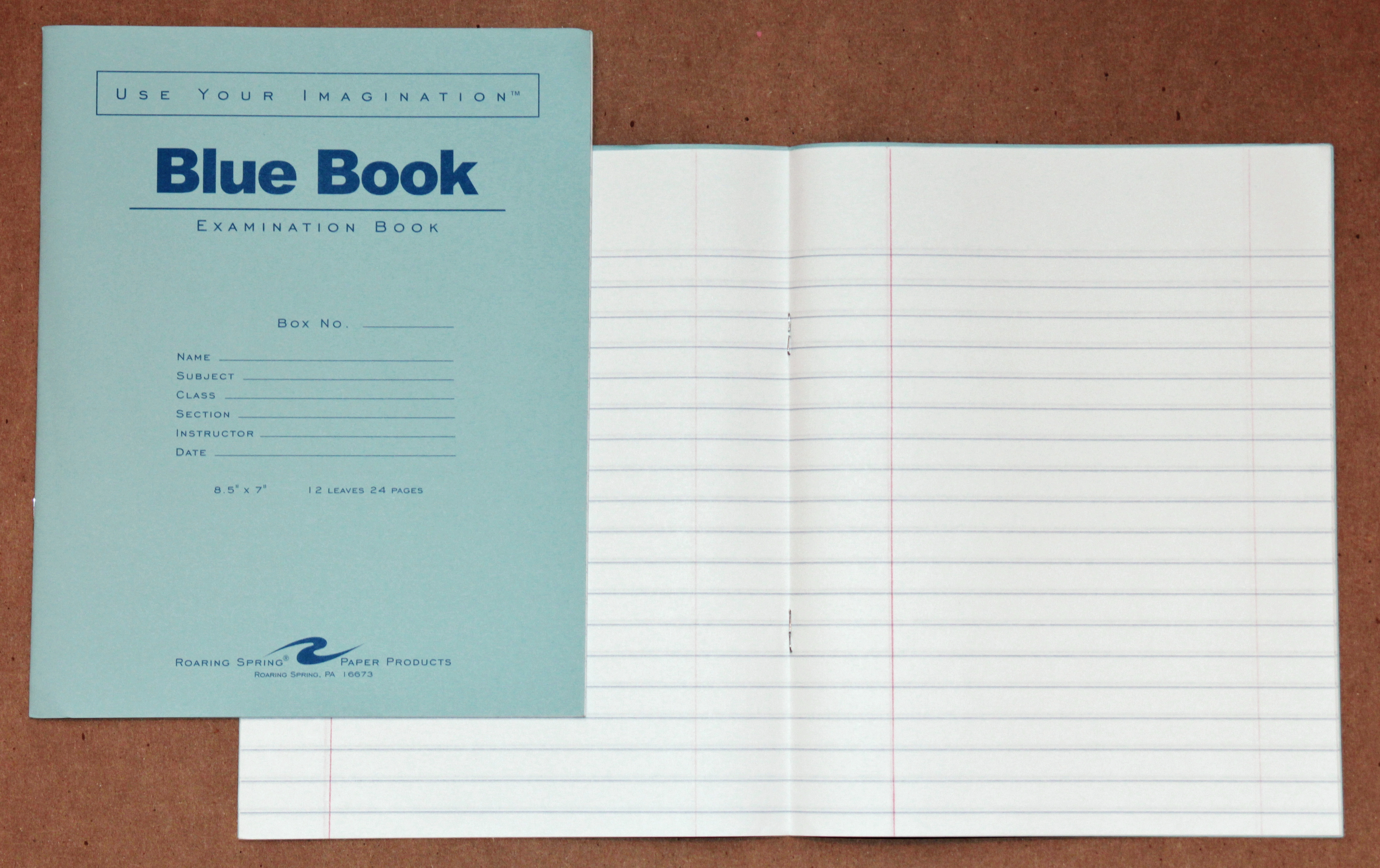
A 12-sheet Blue book

An examination book, or exam book, or blue book is a notebook used by students of many post-secondary schools in the United States to write essays and answer multiple short-answer questions when their assessment tests are administered. The books commonly have a blue cover and are titled "Blue book", although books called simply "Examination book" can be found as well.

Blue books typically have dimensions 8 1/2 by 7 inches (220 mm × 180 mm) or 11 by 8 1/2 inches (280 mm × 220 mm), and contain from four to twelve sheets of ruled paper, stapled through the fold.

Blue books can prevent some forms of academic cheating with pre-written booklets by having students submit their blank blue books and randomly re-distributing them, or starting on or skipping certain pages.

== See also ==
- Blue book exam
- Exercise book
- Notebook
- Ruled paper
