= Micro perforated plate =

Sound absorber

A micro perforated plate (MPP) is a device used to absorb sound, reducing its intensity. It consists of a thin flat plate, made from one of several different materials, with small holes punched in it. An MPP offers an alternative to traditional sound absorbers made from porous materials.

== Structure ==
An MPP is normally 0.5–2 mm thick. The holes typically cover 0.5 to 2% of the plate, depending on the application and the environment in which the MPP is to be mounted. Hole diameter is usually less than 1 millimeter, typically 0.05 to 0.5 mm. They are usually made using the microperforation process.

== Operating principle ==
The goal of a sound absorber is to convert acoustical energy into heat. In a traditional absorber, the sound wave propagates into the absorber. Because of the proximity of the porous material, the oscillating air molecules inside the absorber lose their acoustical energy due to friction.

A MPP works in almost the same way. When the oscillating air molecules penetrate the MPP, the friction between the air in motion and the surface of the MPP dissipates the acoustical energy.

== Comparison with other materials ==
Traditional sound absorbers are porous materials such as mineral wool, glass or polyester fibres. It is not possible to use these materials in harsh environments such as engine compartments. Traditional absorbers have many drawbacks, including pollution, the risk of fire, and problems with the useful lifetime of the absorbing material.

The main reason why Micro Perforates have become so popular among acousticians is that they have a good absorption performance but without the disadvantages of a porous material. Furthermore, an MPP is also preferable from an aesthetic point of view.

== History ==
For a while, perforated metal panels with holes in the 1–10 mm range have been used as a cage for sound-absorbing glass-fiber bats where large holes let the sound waves reach into the absorbent fiber. Another use has been the creation of narrowband Helmholtz absorbers which can be tuned by hole size and the dimensions of the hole distance and air gap behind the panel. However, when the hole dimensions are in the region of 0.05–0.5 mm, the narrow absorption peaks become much wider, making the additional fiber absorber more or less unnecessary, while still maintaining a very high absorption factor. By varying geometrical and material parameters, the acoustical performance can be tailored to meet a multitude of specifications in various applications.

One early contributor to the theory of micro perforated plates as sound absorbers was Professor Daa-You Maa. Further possibilities aiming to improve the accuracy of Maa's original model are currently being investigated. One other major phenomenon that currently being investigated is the nonlinear effect i.e. an MPP behaves differently depending on the magnitude of the incident sound wave.
