= Disc-binding =

Type of notebook bind

Detail of the perforation-to-disc binding system

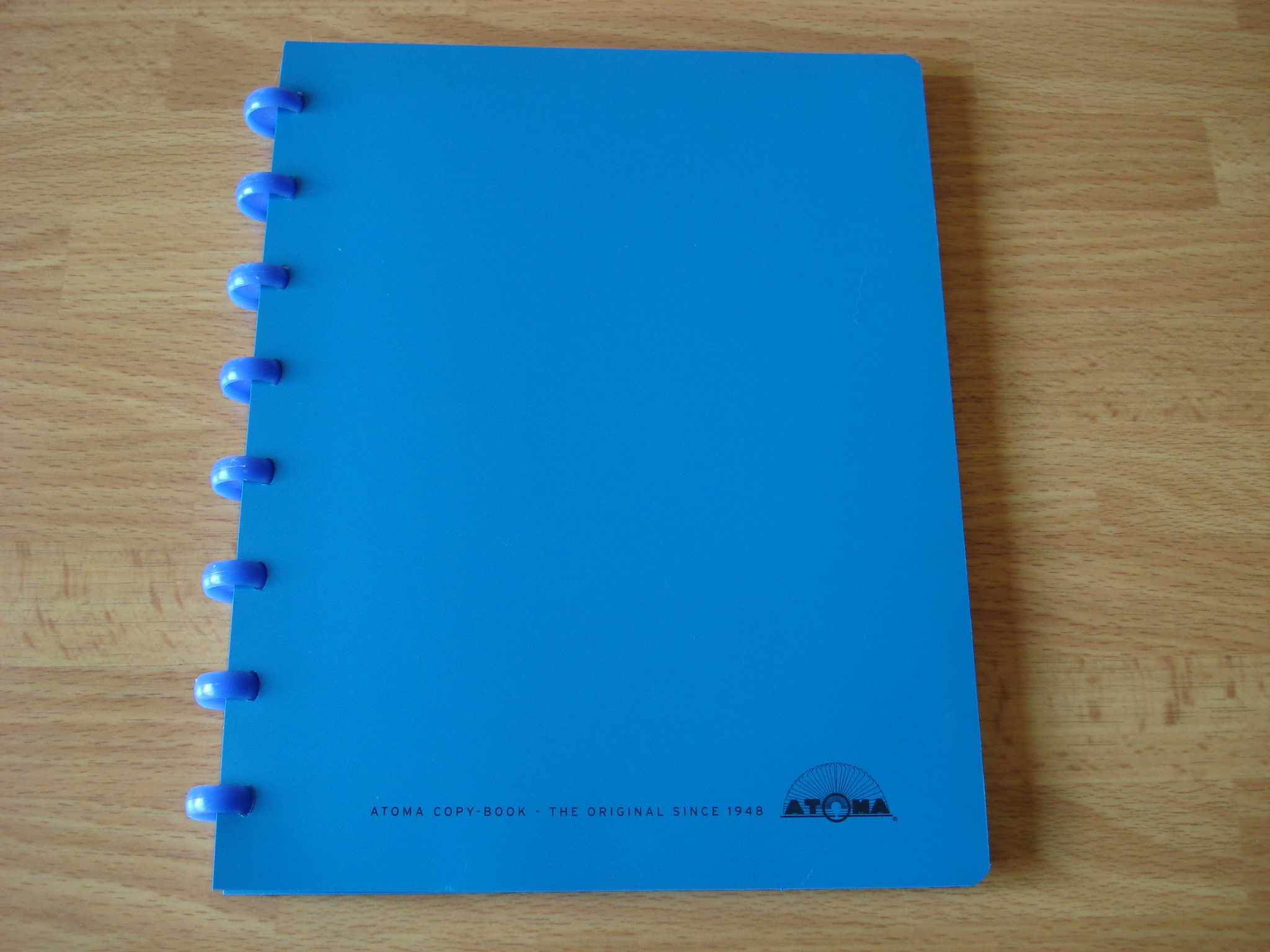
Atoma notebook

Disc-binding is a type of notebook binding that uses discs to hold the sheets of paper. Each disc has a raised edge. Notebook sheets have perforations along the binding edge that match the profile and spacing of the binding discs.

Notebook sheets are removed by peeling the perforations away from the binding discs. Sheets are added by affixing the perforations to the discs. Sheets can be transferred between disc-bound notebooks of different functions and sizes, provided the discs have the same profile and spacing. In addition to using paper specifically manufactured for a particular disc-binding system, ordinary paper can be inserted by using a specially designed hole punch to perforate the pages to conform to the discs.

It may be argued that disc-binding allows single pages to be easily added or removed with disc-bound notebooks; however, transfer of large amount of pages from one notebook to another is substantially more difficult with disc-bound notebooks, compared to ring-bound ones.

== Invention and patents ==
Andre Tomas and Andre Martin (from whom the Atoma brand name was derived) invented and patented the first disc-binding system. In 1948, they sold their patent to Georges Mottart, who founded Papeteries G. Mottart n.v., the exclusive producer of disc-binding systems in Europe until the mid-1990s, when the patent expired. Atoma sells 1–1.5 million disc-bound notebooks yearly.

In June 1995, Jack and Shirley Feldman filed a patent application with the United States Patent and Trademark Office claiming improvements they made to the Flic disk-binding notebook system. The Feldmans had an agreement with Israeli company Mapal, owner of the Flic brand but lost their distribution rights sometime in late 1995, early 1996. In April 1996, Mitch Greenberg met Jack Feldman and along with Ed Finkelstein, founded Rollabind, Inc. The new company, led by Greenberg, proceeded to build its brand and infrastructure to supply product to the expanding marketplace growing from a few thousand dollars in sales to over $8 million in sales by 2001. The patent office issued United States patents to the Feldmans numbered 5,553,959 (1996) and 5,749,667 (1998). For a time, Levenger Company bought notebooks and supplies for the disk-binding system from Rollabind, Inc which at the time was controlled by Mitch Greenberg and Ed Finkelstein with Feldman being a 1/3 partner. Levenger sold the notebooks and supplies under its own Circa brand name. In 2002, Greenberg and Finkelstein sold their interest in the company to a group led by Michael Olsher with Feldman still involved and formed a new company, Rollabind, LLC. After about 2 years, the Olsher group sold out to another individual who invested an undisclosed sum but was out in just over 1 year after losing their investment. In 2004, the Feldmans licensed Levenger under their patents to manufacture the notebooks and supplies. In early 2006, Levenger learned that Staples and Target marketed notebooks similar to Levenger's Circa line. In November 2006, Levenger filed a civil action in the United States District Court for the Southern District of Florida that sought a declaratory judgment that the Feldmans' patents were invalid and for various other relief and stopped paying royalties under the patent license. The defendants filed a counterclaim alleging that Levenger infringed the patents and misappropriated trade secrets. After a trial, in September 2007 the court declared the patents invalid and unenforceable, denied most of the other relief that Levenger sought (including refund of royalties Levenger paid under the patent license and reimbursement of its legal fees), and denied defendants' counterclaim.
