= Blue book exam =

Type of exam in the United States

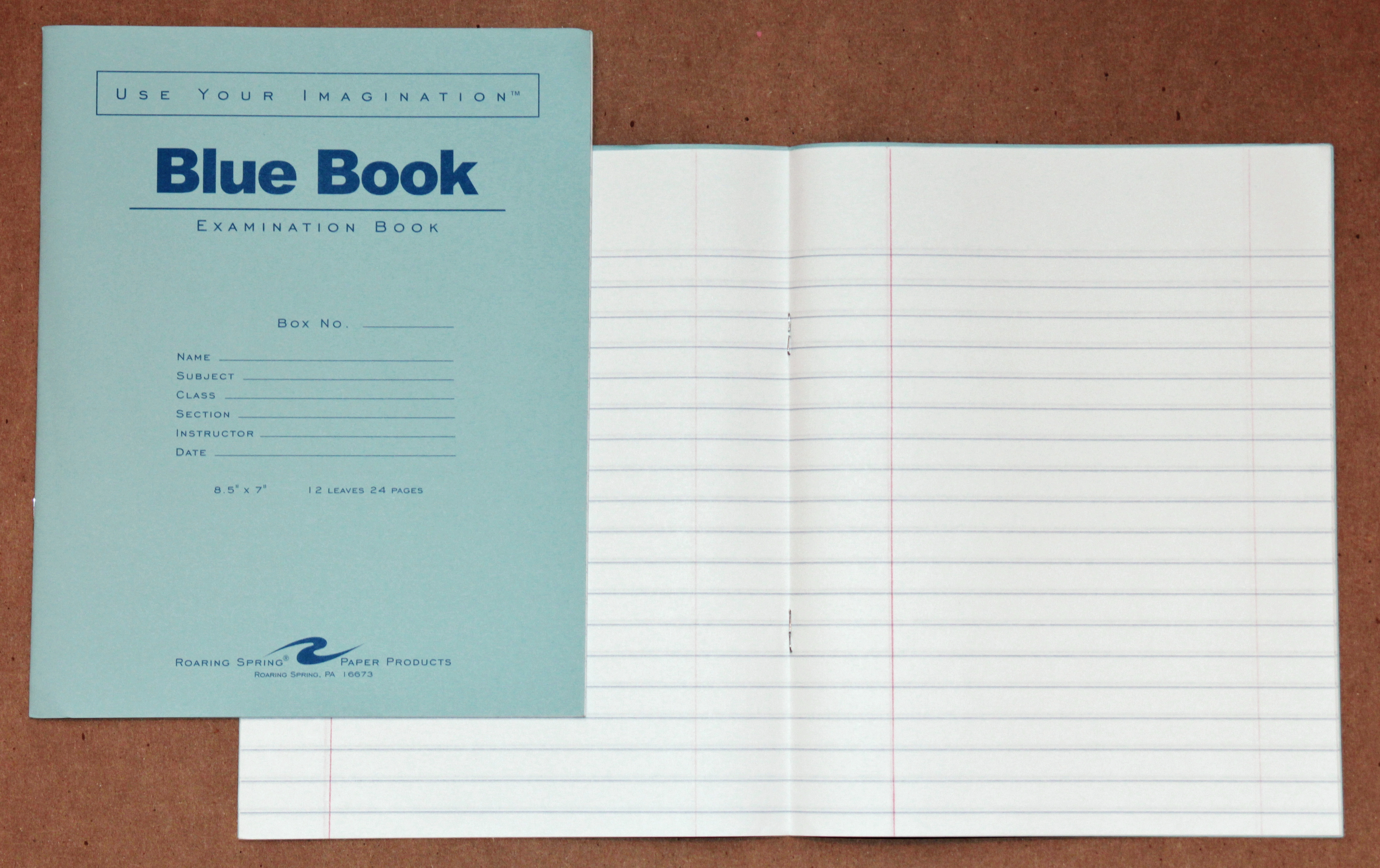
A Blue Book-branded examination book.

A blue book exam is a type of test administered at many post-secondary schools in the United States and India. Blue book exams typically include one or more essays or short-answer questions to be written under the supervision of the instructor, oftentimes on special blue paper provided by the school. The instructor may provide students with a list of possible essay topics prior to the test itself and will then choose one or let the student choose from two or more topics that appear on the test.

Blue books can prevent some forms of academic cheating with pre-written booklets by having students submit their blank blue books and randomly re-distributing them, or starting on or skipping certain pages.

== History ==
Butler University in Indianapolis was the first to introduce exam blue books, which first appeared in the late 1920s. They were given a blue color because Butler's school colors are blue and white; therefore they were named "blue books".

Starting in 2024, blue book exams experienced a significant resurgence in popularity within higher education as a direct response to the widespread use of large language models for academic cheating.

== See also ==
- Examination book
