= Police notebook =

Official record notebook used by UK police

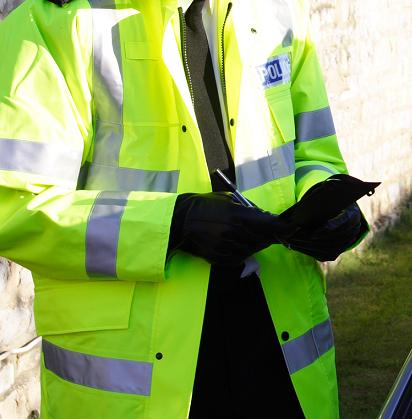
A British police officer using his notebook while stopping a vehicle

A police notebook or pocket notebook (PNB) is a notebook used by police officers in the United Kingdom to officially record details and incidents while on patrol. Its use is controlled by a number of guidelines, as information entered into an officer's PNB is admissible in court, and the officer will use it to refresh their memory while giving evidence, and to support their statements. Some forces have replaced paper PNBs with ePNBs; these are electronic versions on police smart phones.

== Procedure ==
Not all police officers are required to use PNBs; those in administrative roles (aside from those working in offices open to public enquiries) are not required to maintain them. Nor are officers working on custody stations, or those involved in training. Intelligence officers, control room staff, and officers who hold the rank of Superintendent or Chief Superintendent are all exempt from maintaining a PNB.

Each PNB is issued to an officer by a supervisor, and they are each marked by a particular code which is logged next to that officer's name. A replacement PNB can only be given when the old has been examined and marked correctly, and as well as their current PNB, an officer is also required to keep the two most recent PNBs.

== Technique ==
While the guidelines for maintaining a PNB will differ from force to force, there are several common policies on using the notebooks. In the United Kingdom the use of the PNBs is dictated by the 2000 Freedom of Information Act. All PNBs are subject to the same rules of disclosure as other confidential documents, and must contain everything deemed relevant to police work. Each new entry is marked with the day and date in capital letters, and is ended with a line covering the entire width of the page, along with the officer's signature. No information may be removed, and all corrections must be made by striking the incorrect entry with a line and the correct entry should be inserted with the officer's initials. Time is required to be written in 24-hour style, and any gaps left at the end of a line must be filled by a horizontal line to show that the gap was not created by the removal of a word. Many forces also require directly quoted speech to be written in capitals.

When an officer needs to record information in their notebook the following are required by several forces:

- Time of day
- Exact or approximate location
- Offence or occurrence
- Names and addresses of offenders, victims or witnesses
- Action taken by the officer involved (e.g. arrests)

Some forces require the officer to write down what they said during the incident.

== Equipment ==
Police notebooks are carried in a variety of ways, and several pieces of equipment are available which police officers may use to hold their PNBs and other papers they need while on patrol. Police notebooks themselves also have to stand up to harsh environments such as wind and rain. Therefore, the paper used is usually waterproof and untearable.

== See also ==
- Clipboard
