= JL Darling =

American waterproof paper company

- Trade name: Rite in the Rain
- Type: Private company LLC
- Industry: Stationery
- Founded: 1916; 110 years ago
- Founder: Jerry L. Darling
- Headquarters: Tacoma, Washington, United States
- Products: Waterproof paper, waterproof pads, waterproof pens
- Website: www.riteintherain.com

JL Darling is an American waterproof paper pads and stationery company based in Tacoma, Washington. It was founded 1916 and is known for "Rite in the Rain" waterproof paper pads.

The pads originally supplied timbermen in the rainy Pacific Northwest but the company branched out and now a third of its sales are to the U.S. military.

== History ==
The first paper processing formula, using zinc, white varnish and wheat flour, was patented in 1917 or 1920 by Jerry L. Darling who was originally from the Grays Harbor area.

The pads originally supplied timbermen in the rainy Pacific Northwest but the company branched out and by 2003 a third of its sales are to the U.S. military, with products including field notebooks and waterproof pens. Other specialty products include notebooks for news reporters, contractors and firefighters; For ranchers to track calving; OSHA industrial compliance forms, field interview forms for police, field diagrams for soccer coaches, expedition notebooks for mountain climbers, notebooks for underwater use by scuba divers; and waterproof military zeroing and bullseye targets.

The Tacoma factory burned down in 1986. The company found that although its finished products had been soaked with water by the fire fighting effort, they were undamaged, and were trimmed and used for four or five months of inventory after the fire.
