= Nelson's Encyclopaedia =

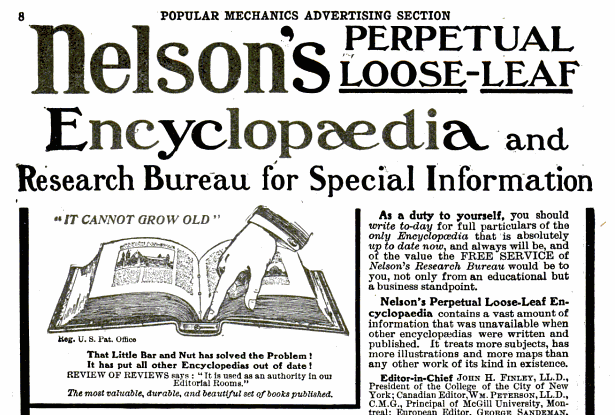
1910 ad

Nelson's Perpetual Loose Leaf Encyclopaedia: An International Work of Reference was an encyclopedia originally published in twelve volumes by Thomas Nelson and Sons starting with Volume 1 in 1906 through to Volume 12 in 1907. It was published in loose leaf format; subscribers received updates every six months. Its editor-in-chief was John H. Finley. It ceased publication in approximately 1934.

A contemporary review in The New York Times read:

... the book that literally never does grow old, that has a concise, authoritative statement on the memorable event of yesterday as well as on the event that occurred thousands of years ago; the book that is never finished, and that nevertheless has the latest word on pretty much any subject regarding which immediate information is desired, seems very much like the wild and insubstantial dream of some overworked press agent, were it not that the thing has actually been accomplished, that the book in question really does exist ...

The first edition of Nelson's Encyclopaedia was published in 1904 with a conventional binding.

== Advertising slogans ==
Some slogans used in advertising it include:"A New Encyclopaedia Today", "Still New Six Months from Today!", "STILL NEW Ten Years from Today!", "The Encyclopaedia for a Lifetime!", and "NELSON'S PERPETUAL LOOSE-LEAF ENCYCLOPAEDIA Never Grows Old"

== Binding ==
Patent drawings for Nelson's Encyclopaedia looseleaf binding

The pages of the encyclopedia are bound using a locking device patented by Charles E. Baldauf and designed specifically for updating an encyclopedia, "which is to be supplied from time to time with additional insertion pages of printed matter ...".
