= Notebook =

Book for writing, drawing, scrapbooking

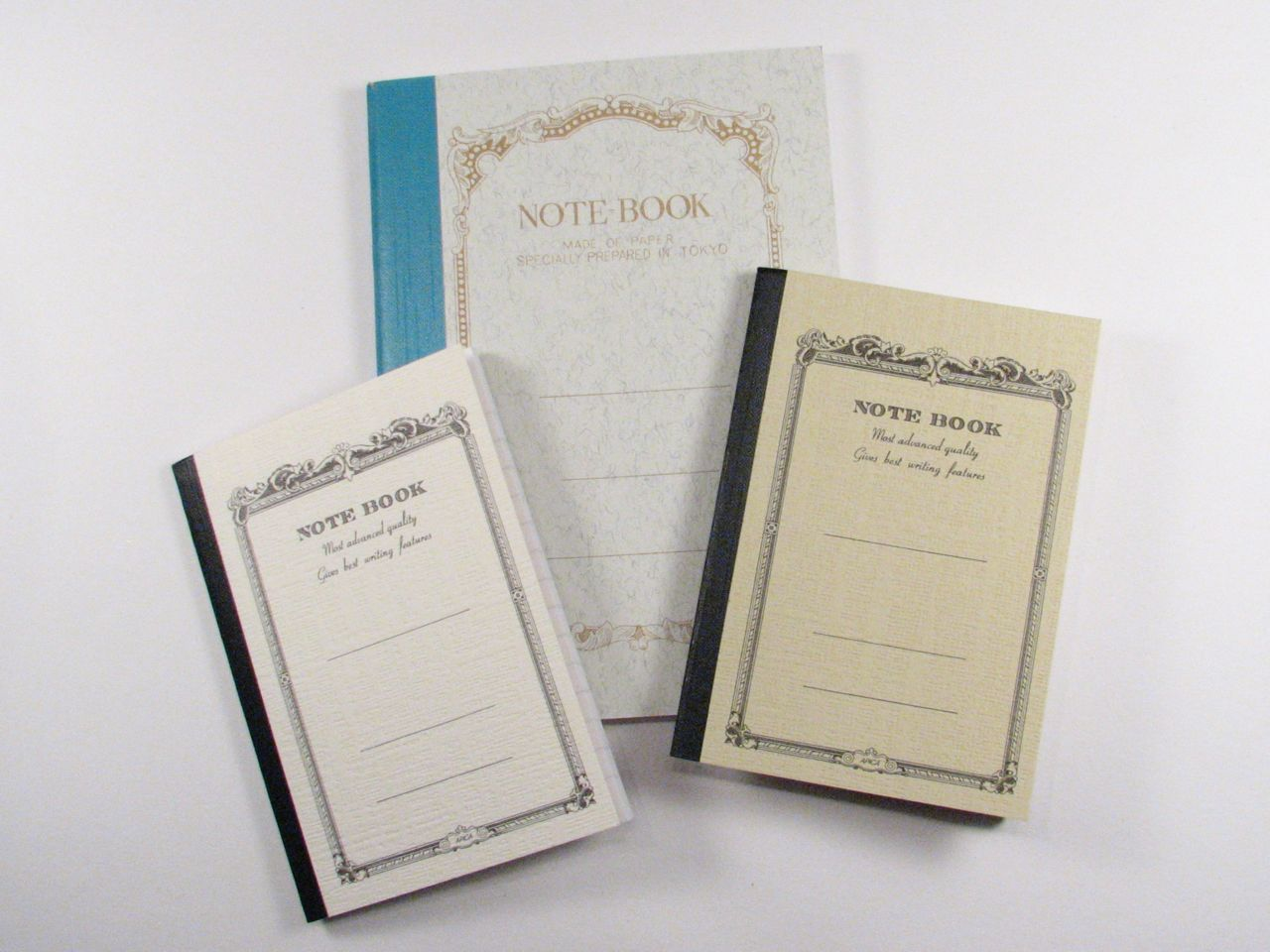
A selection of notebooks

A notebook (also known as a notepad, writing pad, drawing pad, or legal pad) is a book or stack of paper pages that are often ruled and used for purposes such as note-taking, journaling, or other writing, drawing, or scrapbooking and more.

== History ==
=== Early times ===
The earliest form of notebook was the wax tablet, which was used as a reusable and portable writing surface in classical antiquity and throughout the Middle Ages.

As paper became more readily available in European countries from the 11th century onwards, wax tablets gradually fell out of use, although they remained relatively common in England, which did not possess a commercially successful paper mill until the late 16th century.

==== As table-books ====
While paper was cheaper than wax, its cost was sufficiently high to ensure the popularity of erasable notebooks, made of specially-treated paper that could be wiped clean and used again. These were commonly known as table-books, and are frequently referenced in Renaissance literature, most famously in Shakespeare's Hamlet:

"My tables,—meet it is I set it down, That one may smile, and smile, and be a villain."

Despite the apparent ubiquity of such table-books in Shakespeare's time, very few examples have survived, and little is known about their exact nature, use, or history of production. The earliest extant edition, bound together with a printed almanac, was made in Antwerp, Belgium, in 1527.

By the end of this decade, table-books were being imported into England, and they were being printed in London from the 1570s.

At this time, however, it appears that the concept of an erasable notebook was still something of a novelty to the British public, as the printed instructions included with some books were headed:

"To make clean your Tables when they be written on, which to some as yet is unknown."

The leaves of some table-books were made of donkey skin; others had leaves of ivory or simple pasteboard. The coating was made from a mixture of glue and gesso, and modern-day experiments have shown that ink, graphite and silverpoint writing can be easily erased from the treated pages with the application of a wet sponge or fingertip.

Other types of notebook may also have been in circulation during this time; 17th-century writer Samuel Hartlib describes a table-book made of slate, which did "not need such tedious wiping out by spunges or cloutes".

The leaves of a table-book could be written upon with a stylus, which added to their convenience, as it meant that impromptu notes could be taken without the need for an inkwell (graphite pencils were not in common use until the late 17th century). Table-books were owned by all classes of people, from merchants to nobles, and were employed for a variety of purposes:

Surviving copies suggest that at least some owners (and/or their children) used table-books as suitable places in which to learn how to write. Tables were also used for collecting pieces of poetry, noteworthy epigrams, and new words; recording sermons, legal proceedings, or parliamentary debates; jotting down conversations, recipes, cures, and jokes; keeping financial records; recalling addresses and meetings; and collecting notes on foreign customs while travelling.

The use of table-books for trivial purposes was often satirized on the English stage. For example, Antonio's Revenge by John Marston (c. 1600) contains the following exchange:

Matzagente: I scorn to retort the obtuse jest of a fool.
[Balurdo draws out his writing tables, and writes.]
Balurdo: Retort and obtuse, good words, very good words.

Their use in some contexts was seen as pretentious; Joseph Hall, writing in 1608, describes "the hypocrite" as one who, "in the midst of the sermon pulls out his tables in haste, as if he feared to lose that note". The practice of making notes during sermons was a common subject of ridicule, and led to table-books becoming increasingly associated with Puritanism during the 17th century.

By the early 19th century, there was far less demand for erasable notebooks, due to the mass-production of fountain pens and the development of cheaper methods for manufacturing paper. Ordinary paper notebooks became the norm. During the Enlightenment, British schoolchildren were commonly taught how to make their own notebooks out of loose sheets of paper, a process that involved folding, piercing, gathering, sewing and/or binding the sheets.

=== Legal pad ===
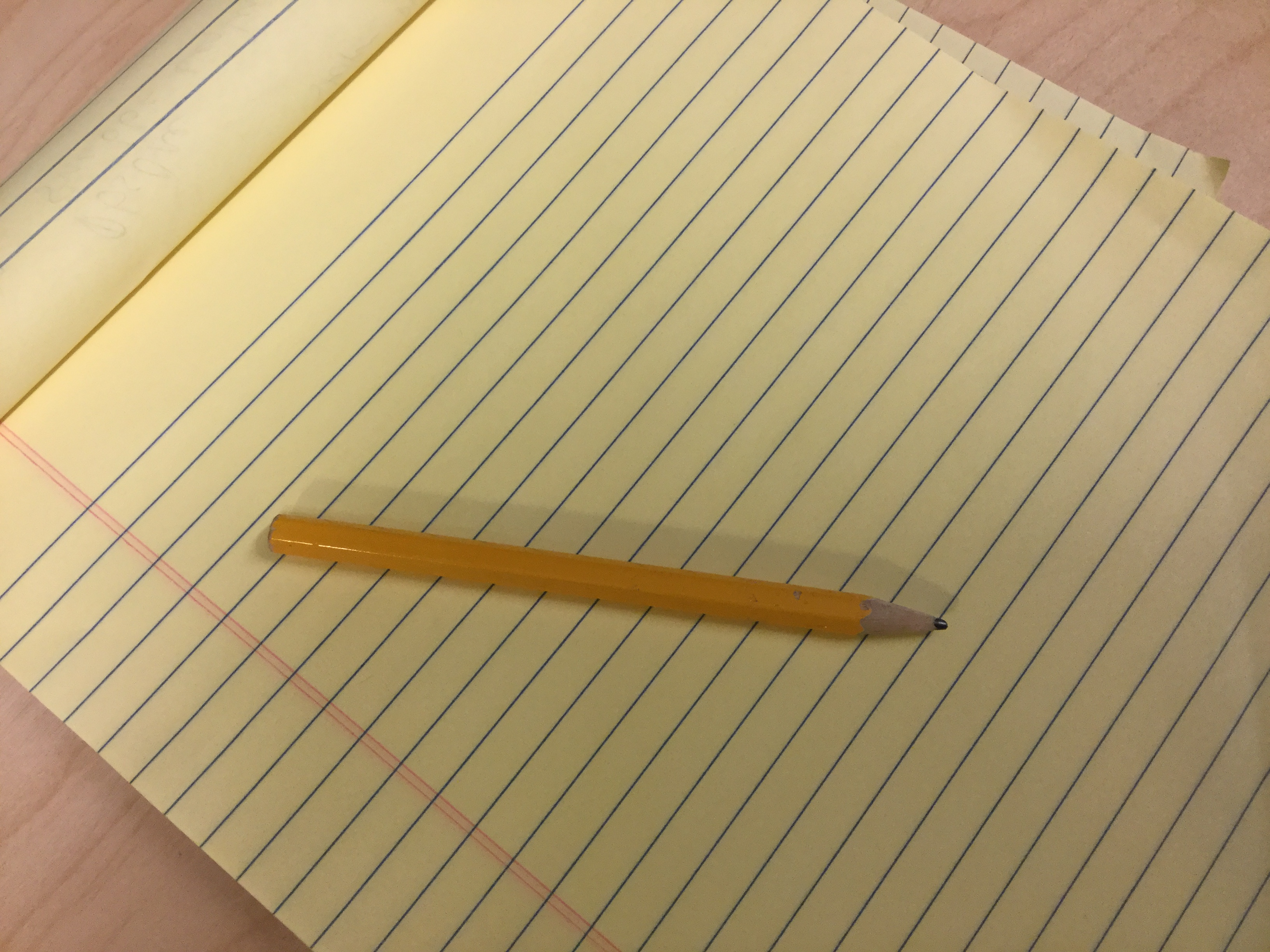
Legal pad and pencil

According to a legend, Thomas W. Holley of Holyoke, Massachusetts, invented the legal pad around the year 1888 when he innovated the idea to collect all the sortings, various sorts of sub-standard paper scraps from various factories, and stitch them together in order to sell them as pads at an affordable and fair price.

In about 1900, the latter then evolved into the modern, traditionally yellow legal pad when a local judge requested for a margin to be drawn on the left side of the paper. This was the first legal pad.

The only technical requirement for this type of stationery to be considered a true "legal pad" is that it must have margins of 1.25 inches (3.17 centimeters) from the left edge. Here, the margin, also known as down lines, is room used to write notes or comments.

Legal pads usually have a gum binding at the top instead of a spiral or stitched binding.

In 1902, J.A. Birchall of Birchalls, a stationery shop based in Launceston, Tasmania, Australia, decided that the cumbersome method of selling writing paper in folded stacks of "quires" (four sheets of paper or parchment folded to form eight leaves) was inefficient.

As a solution, he glued together a stack of halved sheets of paper, supported by a sheet of cardboard, creating what he called the "Silver City Writing Tablet".

== Structures ==
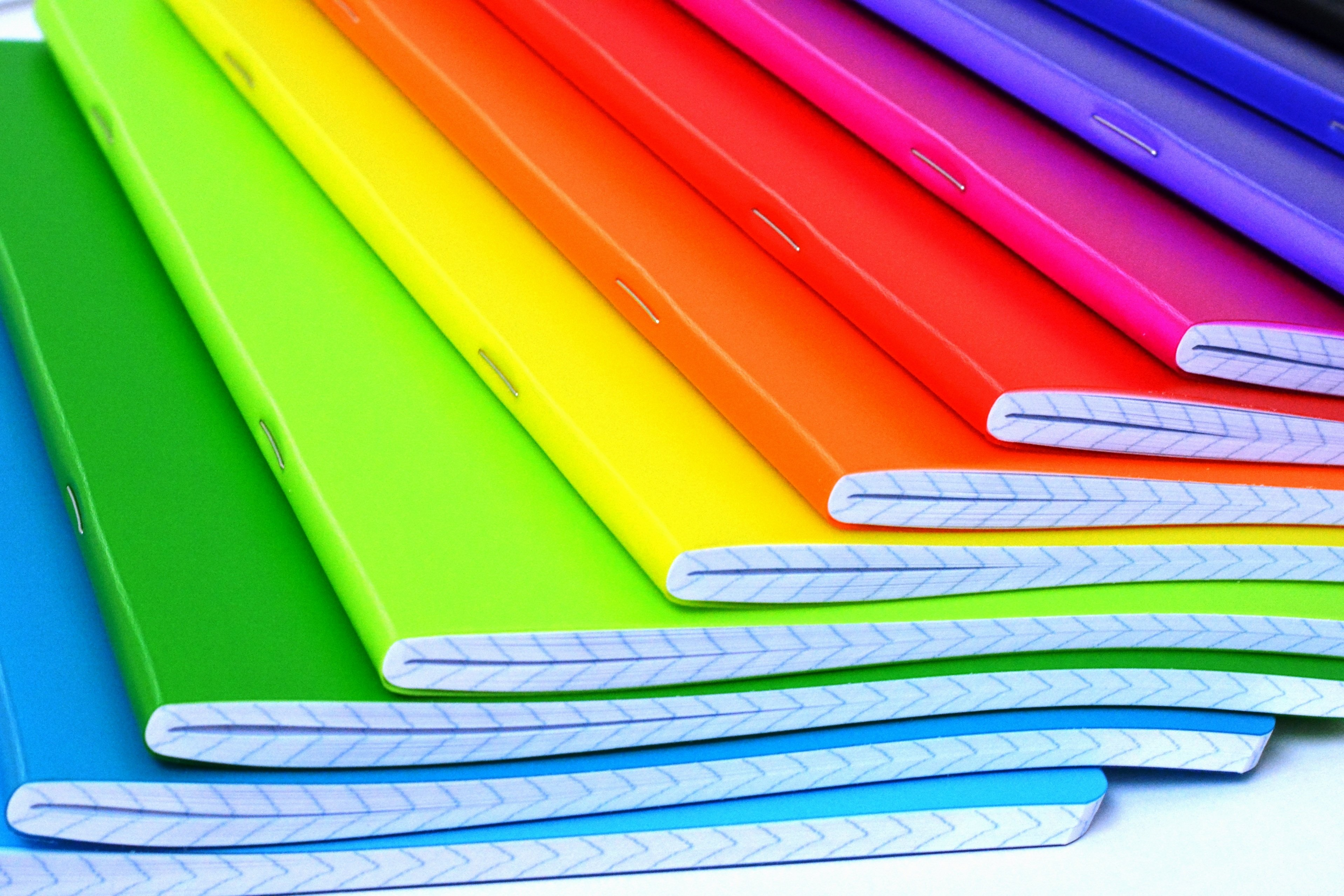
Notebooks with different color covers

=== Binding ===
Principal types of binding are padding, perfect, spiral, comb, sewn, clasp, disc, and pressure, some of which can be combined. Binding methods can affect whether a notebook can lie flat when open and whether the pages are likely to remain attached.

It is frequently cheaper to purchase notebooks that are spiral-bound, meaning that a spiral of wire is looped through large perforations at the top or side of the page. Other bound notebooks are available that use glue to hold the pages together; this process is "padding."

=== Covers ===
The cover material is usually distinct from the writing surface material, more durable, more decorative, and more firmly attached.

It is also stiffer than the pages, even when taken together; Cover materials should not contribute to damage or discomfort.

=== Preprinting ===
Notebooks used for drawing and scrapbooking are usually blank.

Notebooks for writing usually have some kind of printing on the writing material, if only lines to align writing or facilitate certain kinds of drawing. Many notebooks also have graphic decorations.

Inventor's notebooks have page numbers preprinted to support priority claims which may be considered as grey literature.

Personal organizers can have various kinds of preprinted pages.

=== Variations ===
Today, it is common for pages in such notebooks to include a thin line of perforations that make it easier to tear out the page.

Spiral-bound pages can be torn out, but frequently leave thin scraggly strips from the small amount of paper that is within the spiral, as well as an uneven rip along the top of the torn-out page.

Hard-bound notebooks include a sewn spine, and the pages are not easily removed. Some styles of sewn bindings allow pages to open flat, while others cause the pages to drape.

Variations of notebooks that allow pages to be added, removed, and replaced are bound by rings, rods, or discs. In each of these systems, the pages are modified with perforations that facilitate the specific binding mechanism's ability to secure them.

Ring-bound and rod-bound notebooks secure their contents by threading perforated pages around straight or curved prongs. In the open position, the pages can be removed and rearranged. In the closed position, the pages are kept in order.

Disc-bound notebooks remove the open or closed operation by modifying the pages themselves. A page perforated for a disc-bound binding system contains a row of teeth along the side edge of the page that grip onto the outside raised perimeter of individual discs.

== Uses ==
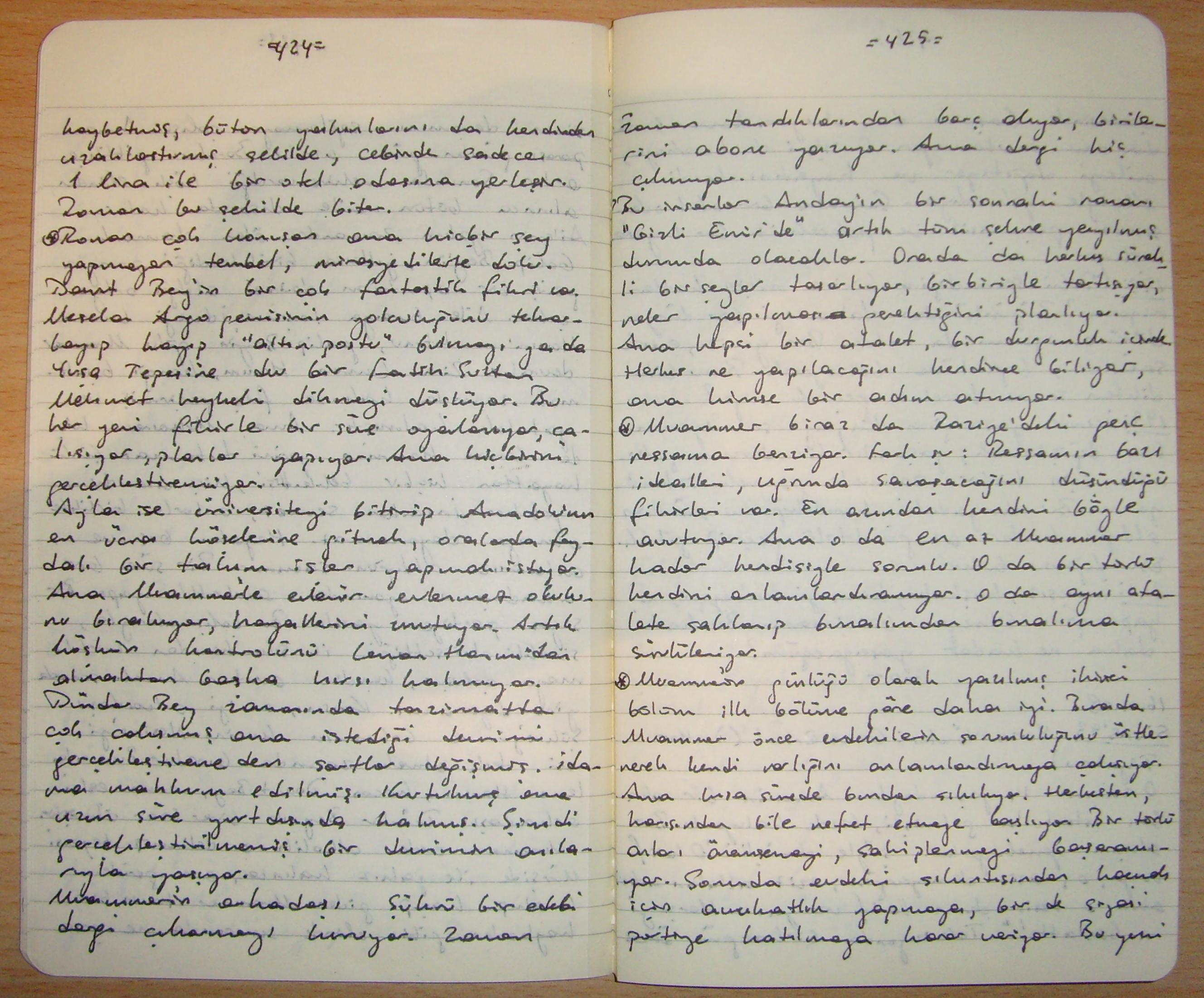
Notes in a notebook

There are many different types of notebooks which often determines its use.

Artists often use sketchbooks which include wide spaces of blank paper appropriate for drawing. They may also use thicker paper if painting or using a variety of mediums in their work. Although large, artists' notebooks also are usually considerably light, because they usually take their notebooks with them everywhere to draw scenery.

Similarly, composers utilize notebooks for writing their lyrics. Lawyers use rather large notebooks known as legal pads that contain lined paper (often yellow) and are appropriate for use on tables and desks. These horizontal lines or "rules" are sometimes classified according to their space apart with "wide rule" the farthest, "college rule" closer, "legal rule" slightly closer and "narrow rule" closest, allowing more lines of text per page. When sewn into a pasteboard backing, these may be called composition books, or in smaller signatures may be called "blue books" or exam books and used for essay exams.

Various notebooks are popular among students for taking notes. The types of notebooks used for school work are single line, double line, four line, square grid line etc. These notebooks are also used by students for school assignments (homeworks) and writing projects.

In contrast, journalists prefer small, hand-held notebooks for portability (reporters' notebooks), and sometimes use shorthand when taking notes. Scientists and other researchers use lab notebooks to document their experiments. The pages in lab notebooks are sometimes graph paper to plot data. Police officers in the United Kingdom are required to write notes on what they observe, using a police notebook. Land surveyors commonly record field notes in durable, hard-bound notebooks called "field books."

Coloring enthusiasts use coloring notebooks for stress relief. The pages in coloring notebooks contain different adult coloring pages. Students take notes in notebooks, and studies suggest that the act of writing (as opposed to typing) improves learning.

Notebook pages can be recycled via standard paper recycling. Recycled notebooks are available, differing in recycled percentage and paper quality.

In Chinese literature, "notebook" or biji is a distinct genre, and has a broader meaning.

== Electronic successors ==
Since the late 20th century, many attempts have been made to integrate the simplicity of a notebook with the editing, searching, and communication capacities of computers through the development of note taking software.

Laptop computers began to be called notebooks when they reached a small size in the mid-1990s. Personal digital assistants (PDAs) came next, integrating small liquid crystal displays with a touch-sensitive layer to input graphics and written text. Later on, this role was taken over by smartphones and tablets.

Digital paper combines the simplicity of a traditional pen and notebook with digital storage and interactivity. By printing an invisible dot pattern on the notebook paper and using a pen with a built in infrared camera the written text can be transferred to a laptop, mobile phone or back office for storage and processing.

== Famous Examples ==
Some famous authors are also famous for the notebooks they left.

- Leonardo da Vinci's journals and notes. His notebooks contain his writings on painting, sculpture, architecture, anatomy, mining, inventions and music, as well as his sketches, his grocery lists and the names of people who owed him money.
- Georg Christoph Lichtenberg's "scrap books". He called his notebooks "waste books," using the English book-keeping term. He earnt posthumous fame solely through his notebooks.
- Paul Valéry's "cahiers"
- Fernando Pessoa's "cadernos"

The notebooks of scientists, such as those of Michael Faraday and Charles Darwin, can reveal the development of their scientific theories. On the other hand, the notebooks used by scientists for recording their experiments are called lab notebooks.

== See also ==
- Commonplace book
- Journal
- Desk pad
- Exercise book
- Fieldnotes
- Palm leaf manuscript
- Writing material
- Graphics tablet – also known as "writing pad" or "drawing pad"
