= Ruled paper =

Writing paper with lines

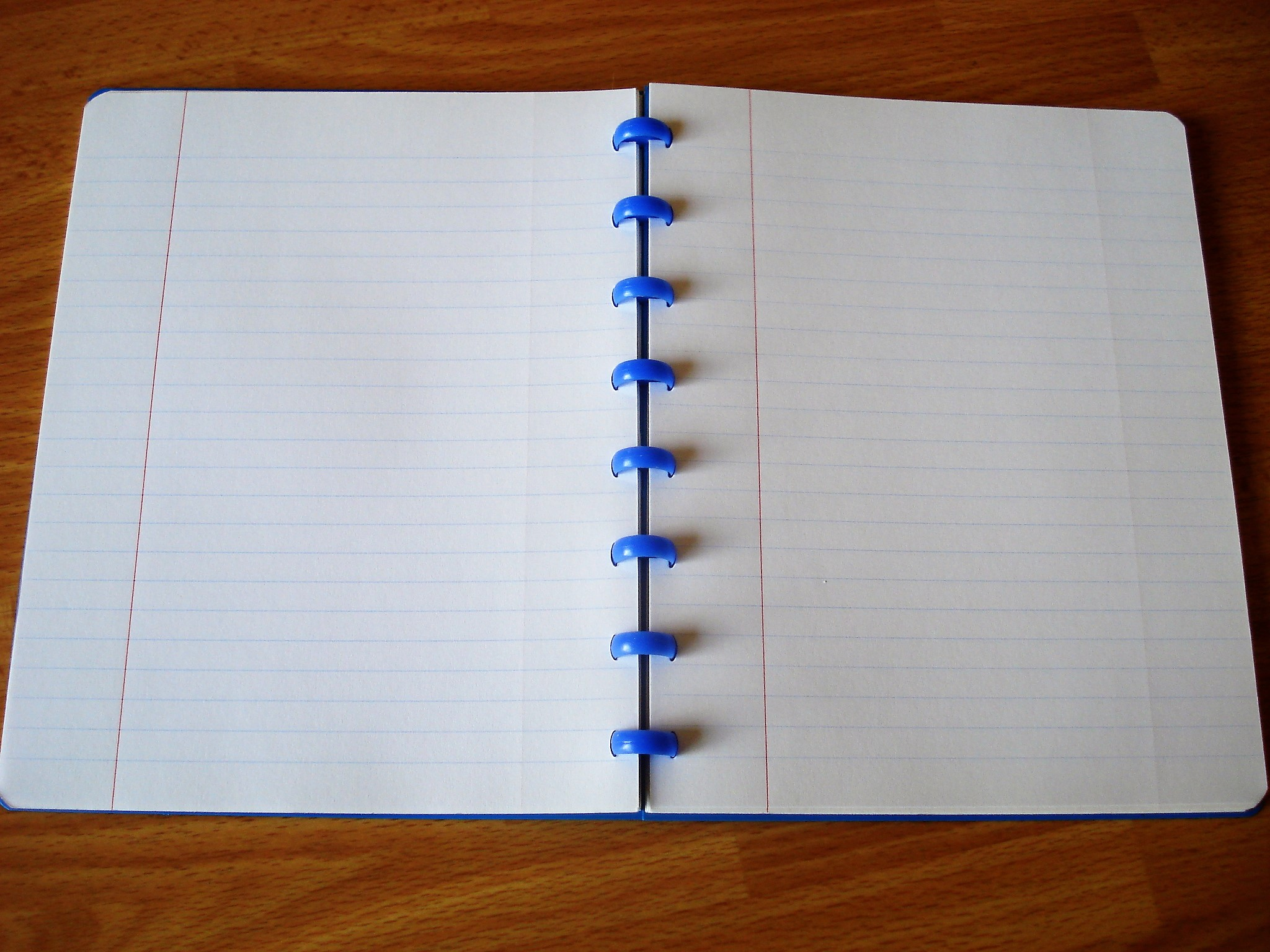
A notebook with ruled paper

Ruled paper (or lined paper) is writing paper printed with lines as a guide for handwriting. The lines often are printed with fine width and in light colour and such paper is sometimes called feint-ruled paper. Additional vertical lines may provide margins, act as tab stops or create a grid for plotting data; for example, graph paper (squared paper or grid paper) is divided into squares by horizontal and vertical lines.

== History ==
Initially, paper was ruled by hand, sometimes using templates. Scribes could rule their paper using a "hard point," a sharp implement which left embossed lines on the paper without any ink or color, or could use "metal point," an implement which left colored marks on the paper, much like a graphite pencil, though various other metals were used.

On 15 June 1770, English inventor John Tetlow patented a "machine for ruling paper for music and other purposes." A later machine was invented by William Orville Hickok in the mid-19th century.

== Generic types ==
Lines on ruled paper provide a guide to help users keep their writing or drawing consistent with a predetermined set of rules. The ruling layout is not determined by the paper size but by the purpose, style of handwriting or the language used. Many different line layouts support handwriting, calligraphy, plotting data on graphs, musical notation or help teach students to write in a particular language or script. The following are common examples:

- **Note paper** (or Writing paper, Filler paper, Loose leaf paper, Binder paper) is typically used for handwriting and is produced in different layouts and sizes. The layout usually consists of evenly spaced horizontal lines, or feints, with vertical lines drawn to indicate margins, the middle of the page, or sections of a line.
- **Graph paper** has horizontal and vertical lines evenly spaced over the entire page to create a grid of squares and is used for drafting, drawing and plotting graphs. Often every tenth or fifth line is bolded to assist in counting the lines when plotting data.
- **Quadrille ruled** paper (or quad paper) is similar to graph paper but without the bolded tenth lines. It is useful in mathematics to keep numbers in columns when doing manual operations such as long division or long multiplication, and in spreadsheets or accounts.
- **Semi-log ruled** paper is similar to quadrille ruled, except the horizontal lines are spaced according to the logarithmic scale instead of being evenly spaced.
- **Log-log ruled** paper is similar to semi-log ruled except that both the horizontal and vertical lines are spaced logarithmically.
- **Manuscript paper** is used for handwriting music. The most basic page is laid out with a series of five-line staves, each spanning the width of the page. Any musical notation (clefs, bars, notes, etc.) may be written in as desired by the artist. As notebook paper is to the written word, music manuscript paper is to the written score.

== Regional standards ==
Regional standards exist for ruling layouts, particularly for academic or government clerical purposes.

=== China ===
Elementary students use (田字格) Tianzige ruled paper, featuring boxes for individual characters. Sometimes each box is subdivided (vertically, horizontally, diagonally) as reference to aid the writer with the relative proportion and placement of character components.

In Taiwan, the Japanese genkō yōshi is the main form of rule used by students writing in Mandarin, where it is called 原稿紙 (pinyin: yuángǎo zhǐ). Students use the thin vertical column to transcribe Bopomofo pronunciation.

=== France ===
Paper with Seyès ruling

In order to foster handwriting discipline, a type of ruling known as Seyès ruling is used on paper in schools. Heavy vertical lines are spaced 8 mm (5/16 in) apart, beginning 16 mm (5/8 in) from the left-hand edge of the page. Three lighter lines are spaced 2 mm (5/64 in) apart between each pair of heavy lines. These sheets of paper are generally known as grands carreaux (large tiles) as opposed to the petits carreaux (small tiles) which are 5 × 5mm. Seyès ruled paper is available in single sheets (copies simples) or joined double sheets (copies doubles), which can be preferred for exams, being easier to handle (a single sheet can be lost, they might be used as a portfolio to store more sheets, etc). Seyès ruled paper is available in A4 size (grand format) and in the very school specific 170 × 220 mm format (petit format).

=== Germany ===
The previous standard set by the Deutsches Institut für Normung (German Institute for Standardisation) was DIN 16552:1977-04 ("Lines for handwriting"), which specified the types of ruled paper to be used by school pupils. In 2005, this was updated to DIN 16552-1:2005-05. The line formatting and sizing is sorted according to the Klasse (grade) of the student and the activity. After 5. Klasse, students use 5 or 9 mm high lines according to their preference for margins on the inner and outer edges of the pages. Grid paper for maths is commonly a 5 x 5 mm square grid.

=== India ===
Ruled paper exercise notebooks is available in a variety of semi-standardized formats:

- Double ruled paper commonly two rules in 15 mm spacing
- Four ruled paper similar to Handwriting Paper
- Single ruled paper commonly 8 mm
- Squared maths paper a 5 mm square grid

=== Japan ===
Among others, genkō yōshi (原稿用紙, "manuscript paper") is a kind of paper mainly used for kanji script writing, formed vertically with individual boxes for each Chinese character. There is a thin column to the right of the boxes, for transcribing kana pronunciation. The sizes can vary for ability levels. It is used across the East Asian cultural sphere, for example in Korea for writing proverbs.

=== New Zealand ===
New Zealand standard for school stationery, 1984 specifies standards for ruled and unruled paper.

=== Russia ===
Formats for exercise notebooks are standardised. School exercise books must use 8 mm spacing between the lines. Other ruled paper may use 6 mm, 7 mm, 8 mm and 9 mm spacing. The paper for cursive writing uses pairs of lines 4 mm apart, with 8 mm between the pairs. They may also have angled lines at 65 degrees to vertical to provide additional guidance. The lines can have gray, blue, green or purple color. The vertical margin line must have red or orange color.

=== South Africa ===
A4 Ruled/Ledger Paper: 8 mm line height; 2 cm left margin. Top and bottom margins may vary. Often sold as "college exercise books" or "exam pads".

=== United States ===
Ruled paper is available in a variety of semi-standardized formats:

- Gregg ruled paper has ruling specialized for stenography. "Paper should be smooth and lined, dull in finish, with three lines to the inch and a line down the center."
- Junior legal ruled paper is found on 5-by-8-inch junior legal pads. This can be equal to narrow or medium rule, depending on the manufacturer.
- Manuscript ruled paper is used to teach young children how to write. A blank sheet consists of rows of three lines (the space between them depends on the age group being taught) with the middle line in each three-line set being dotted. The D'Nealian writing style is a well-known teaching method that makes use of this type of paper ruling. Another educational institution, A Beka Book, utilizes this ruling along with a house metaphor (upstairs, downstairs, and basement) to help young children learn where parts of each letter should be written. The usage is similar in concept to the use of the horizontal lines on French Seyès rule paper.
- Medium ruled (or college ruled) paper has 9/32 in (7.1 mm) spacing between horizontal lines, with a vertical margin drawn about 1 1/4 inches (32 mm) from the left-hand edge of the page. Its use is very common in the United States.
- Narrow ruled paper has 1/4 in (8/32 in, 6.4 mm) spacing between ruling lines, and is used by those with smaller handwriting or to fit more lines per page.
- Pitman ruled paper has ruling specialized for stenography. It has 1/2 in (12.7 mm) spacing between ruling lines, with a single margin drawn down the center of the page.
- Wide ruled (or legal ruled) paper has 11/32 in (8.7 mm) spacing between horizontal lines, with a vertical margin drawn about 1 1/4 inches (32 mm) from the left-hand edge of the page. It is commonly used by American children in grade school, as well as by those with larger handwriting.

=== United Kingdom ===
There appears to be no British Standard. However, the line spacing for adult ruled paper is most commonly 8 mm and squared maths paper has a 5 mm grid. Narrow ruled line spacing is typically 6 mm.
There is specialist handwriting paper available for primary schools ("Education standard Learn to Write Exercise books") and a British Standard BS4448 ("Specification for school exercise books and papers"). You can find ruled paper at 15 mm spacing and squared maths paper at 10 mm spacing.
Anything above primary school tends to use adult ruling.

== See also ==
- Exercise book – Type of notebook used in schools
- Genkō yōshi – Japanese manuscript paper
- Graph paper – Writing paper with a grid
