= Hole pincer =

Hole pincer (also holing pincer) may refer to:

- Hole punch
- Leather punch
