= Graphic arts =

Art genre

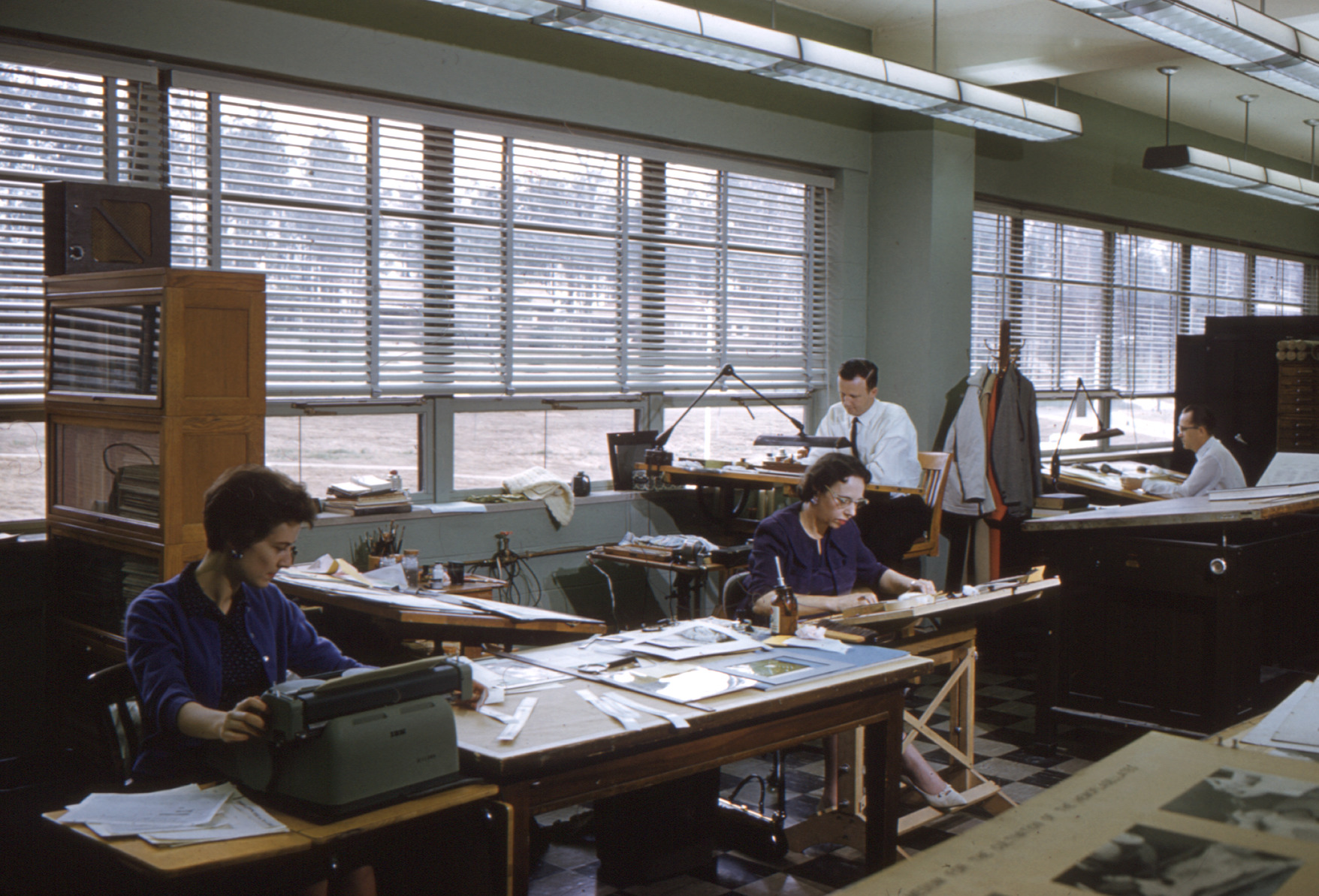
Graphic artists at work during the 1960s

Graphic art covers a broad range of visual artistic expression, which have the following characteristics:

1. It is a category of fine art.
2. typically two-dimensional, i.e. produced on a flat surface, such as paper or electronic screen
3. rely more on line, color or tone, especially drawing and the various forms of engraving

Graphic arts mostly includes drawing, calligraphy, photography, painting, typography, computer graphics, and bindery. Meanwhile we also have printmaking processes such as line engraving, aquatint, drypoint, etching, mezzotint, monotype, lithography, and screen printing (silk-screen, serigraphy). Drawn plans and layouts for interior and architectural designs are sometimes considered to be part of this umbrella category of graphic art too.

In museum parlance "works on paper" is a common term, covering the various types of traditional fine art graphic art. There is now a large sector of graphic designers working mostly on web design.

== History ==
Throughout history, technological inventions have shaped the development of graphic art. In 2500 BC, the Egyptians used graphic symbols to communicate their thoughts in a written form known as hieroglyphics. The Egyptians wrote and illustrated narratives on rolls of papyrus to share the stories and art with others.

During the Middle Ages, scribes manually copied each individual page of manuscripts to maintain their sacred teachings. The scribes would leave marked sections of the page available for artists to insert drawings and decorations. Using art alongside the carefully lettered text enhanced the religious reading experience.

In 1450, Johannes Gutenberg created the first upgraded moving type of mechanical equipment called the printing press. His printing press aided the mass creation of text and visual art, eventually obviating the need for hand transcriptions.

Again during the Renaissance years, graphic art in the form of printing played a major role in the spread of classical learning in Europe. Within these manuscripts, book designers focused heavily on the typeface.

Due to the development of larger fonts during the Industrial Revolution, posters became a popular form of graphic art used to communicate the latest information as well as to advertise the latest products and services.

The invention and popularity of film and television changed graphic art through the additional aspect of motion as advertising agencies attempted to use kinetics to their advantage.

The next major change in graphic arts came when the personal computer was invented in the twentieth century. Powerful computer software enables artists to manipulate images in a much faster and simpler way than the skills of board artists prior to the 1990s. With quick calculations, computers easily recolor, scale, rotate, and rearrange images if the programs are known.

The design of street signs has been impacted by scientific examinations into readability. New York City is in the midst of replacing all of its street signs that have all capital letters with ones that only have upper and lower case letters. They anticipate that greater readability will improve wayfinding and greatly reduce collisions and injuries.

== See also ==
- Animation
- Communication design
- Crowdsourcing creative work
- Digital art
- Illustration
- Caricature
- Cartoon
- Comics
- Graphic design
- Painting
- Performance art
- Printmaking
