= Ticket punch =

Hand tool for marking tickets

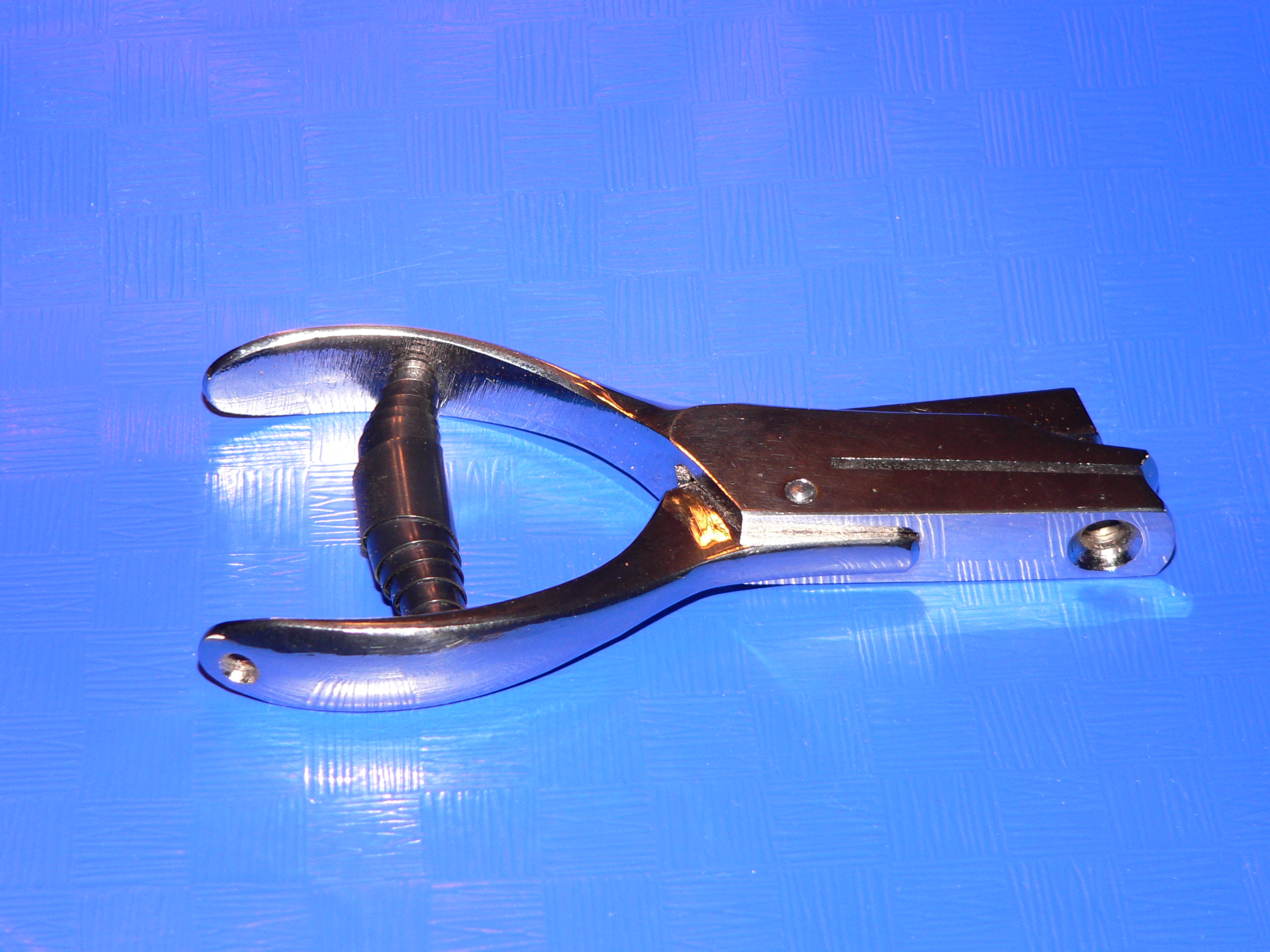
Ticket punch

A ticket punch (or control nippers) is a hand tool for permanently marking admission tickets and similar items of paper or card stock. It makes a perforation and a corresponding chad. A ticket punch resembles a hole punch, differing in that the ticket punch has a longer jaw (or "reach") and the option of having a distinctive die shape. A ticket punch resembles a needle punch in that it makes a distinctive pattern in the item punched, but differs in that it makes a chad.

== Uses ==
Ticket punches are widely used to mark railway passenger tickets, particularly if it is important when and where the ticket was punched. Ticket punches were also widely used in orienteering but have been replaced by needle punches (see control point in Orienteering).

Ticket punches also have decorative uses, involving both their perforations and their chads. Available die shapes include many geometric shapes, silhouettes of objects or animals. Die shapes for company logos and other proprietary images can be manufactured by special arrangement. These are used to punch decorative holes in the margins of pieces of paper, and to make small confetti.

Punched tickets were issued in BEST buses in Mumbai till 2011, when they were replaced with electronic ticketing systems. The older tickets have been reportedly used in artwork as well as in games.

== Gallery ==
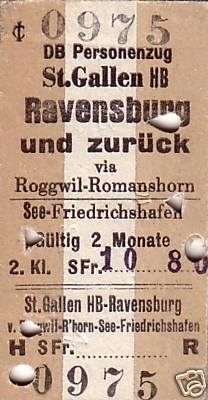
Railway passenger ticket punched multiple times, with at least 4 different die shapes: triangle, oval, and two sizes of tear drop

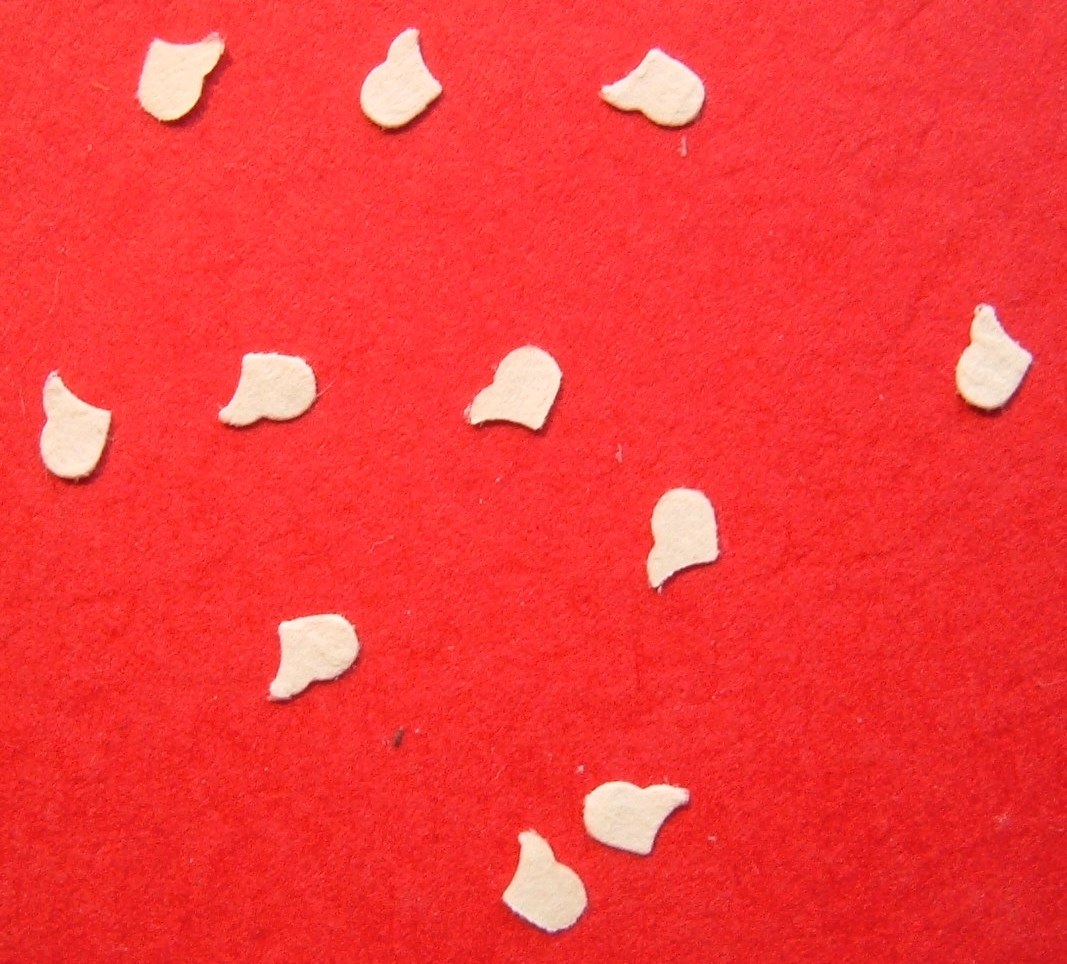
Chad produced by a railroad ticket punch.

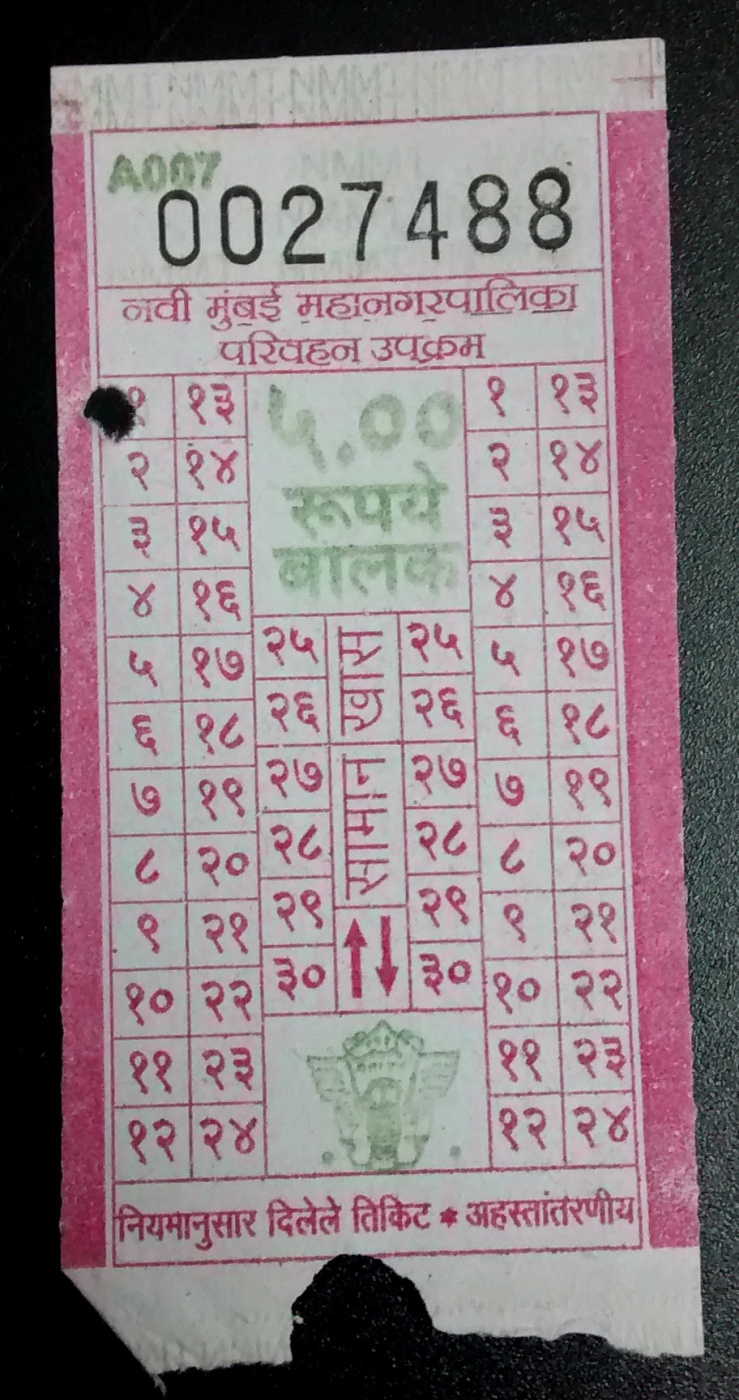
A punched ticket issued by the Navi Mumbai Municipal Transport.

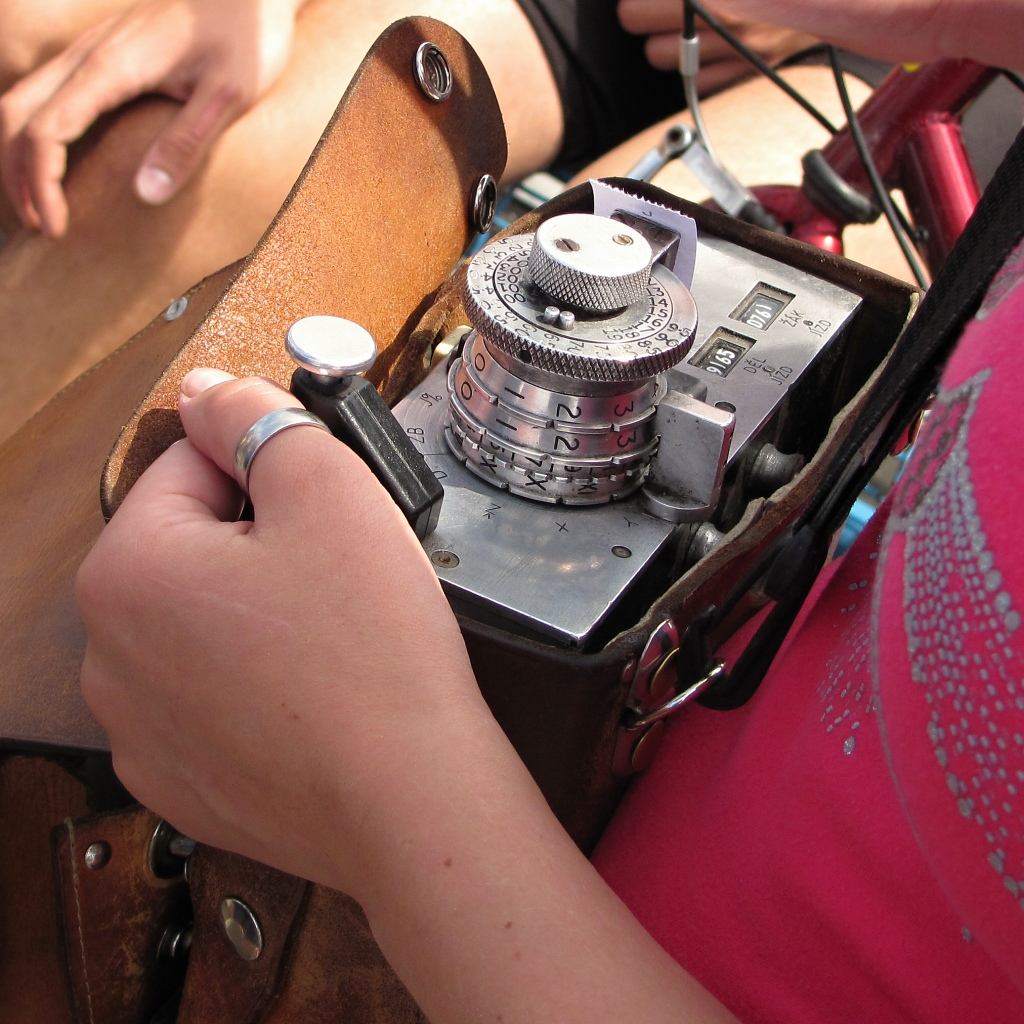
Setright ticket machine, with built-in ticket punch, alongside the thumb

== See also ==
- Marking (disambiguation)
