= Hole punch =

Office tool for making uniform holes in paper

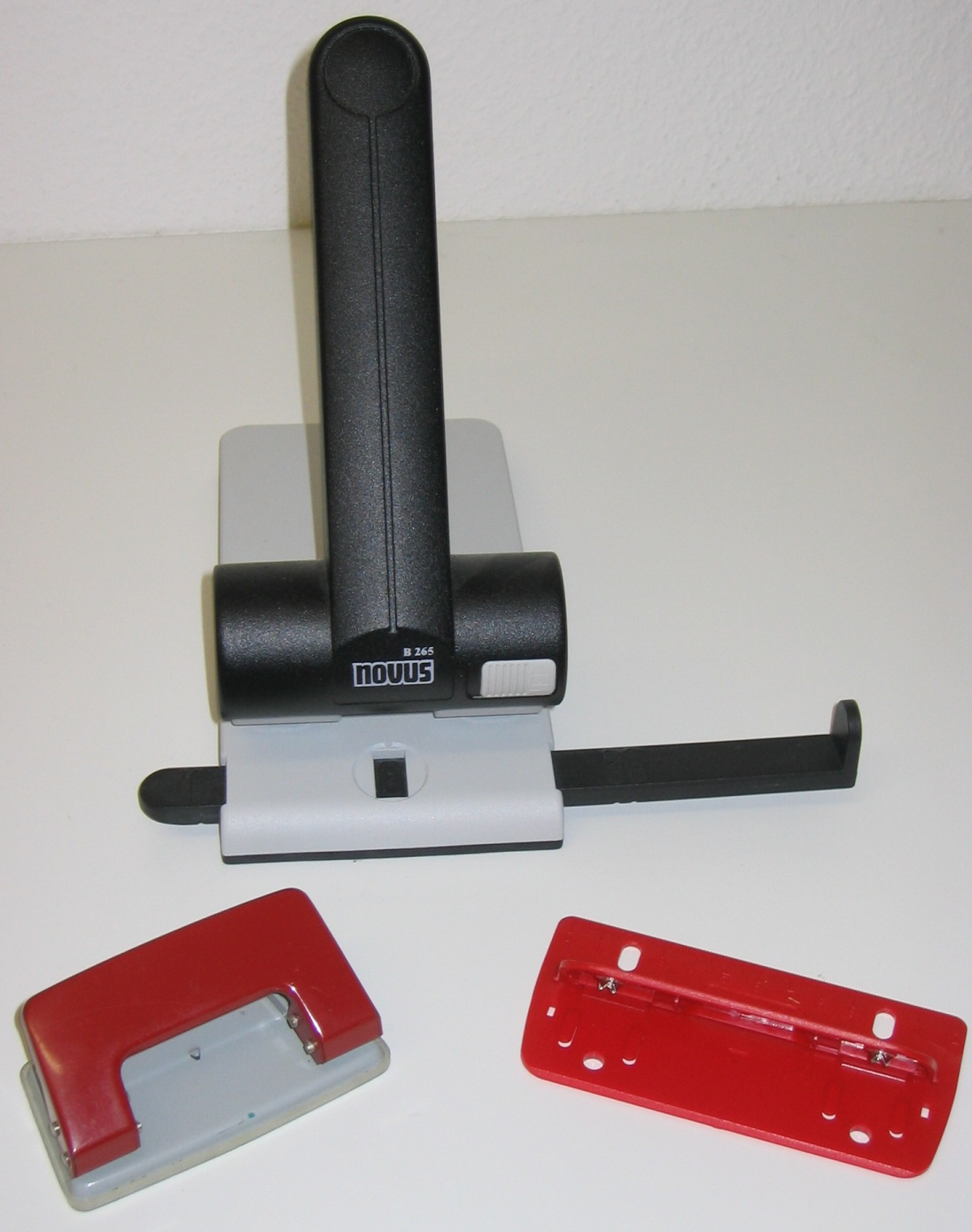
Three different international-standard two-hole punches

A hole punch, also known as a hole puncher or paper puncher, is an office tool used on stationery. Hole punchers are used to create holes in sheets of paper, often for the purpose of collecting the sheets in a binder or folder. They may be handheld, for single holes, larger or table-bound (for two to four holes), or mechanized full-sized machines. Holes are either punched (for single pages of paper to smaller stacks of paper) or bored (for very large stacks of paper, often done by an electrical machine at a professional stationer or printshop). Punched pages of paper (usually referring to pre-punched pages of paper) are called loose leaf. A hole punch can also refer to similar tools for other materials, such as leather, cloth, or sheets of plastic or metal.

== Mechanism ==
Mechanism of a typical hole punch

The essential parts of a hole punch are the handle, the punch head, and the die. The punch head is typically a cylinder, with a flat end called the face. The die is a flat plate, with a hole matching the head. The head can move, while the die is fixed in place. Both head and die are usually made of a hard metal, with precise tolerances. One or more sheets of paper are inserted between the head and the die, with the flat face of the head parallel to the surface of the sheets. Moving the handle pushes the head straight through the sheets of paper. The hard edge of the punch vs the die cuts a hole in the paper, pushing the cut piece out the bottom of the die. The cut-out bit of paper scrap is called a chad.

The handle functions as a lever, decreasing the amount of force the operator needs to apply. The travel distance of the cylinder is generally very short—the thickness of the paper sheets—so the cylinder can be positioned close to the lever fulcrum. For low-volume hole punches, the resulting lever handle need not be more than 8 centimetres (3.1 in) long for sufficient force. Hole punches for larger volumes of paper (hundreds of sheets) feature longer lever arms, but function similarly.

There are hole punches which punch patterns of multiple holes at once, typically for binding multiple sheets together (see § Applications). Such punches generally feature two paper guides for alignment. One guide will be along the side of the paper to be punched, and sets the distance of the holes from the edge of the paper (the margin or gutter). The other guide will be on a perpendicular side, and aligns the holes between the top and bottom of the sheet. One or both guides may be adjustable.

On multiple-hole punches, the positions of individual punch heads may also be adjustable. Commonly, one or more punch heads are mounted in independent fittings, which can slide along a rail. A set screw holds each fitting in position. There may be marks on the device to identify standard hole positions. There may be positions where a punch head will not make contact with the activating handle, allowing holes to be "turned off".

Some punch designs use hollow punch heads (a thin-walled tube), with the edge a sharpened blade. This allows the chads to be pushed up and out the top, as the paper is being cut, making it more suitable for thicker volumes of paper. For very large amounts of paper, a paper drill may be used instead of a punch.

== Applications ==
=== Single-hole punches ===
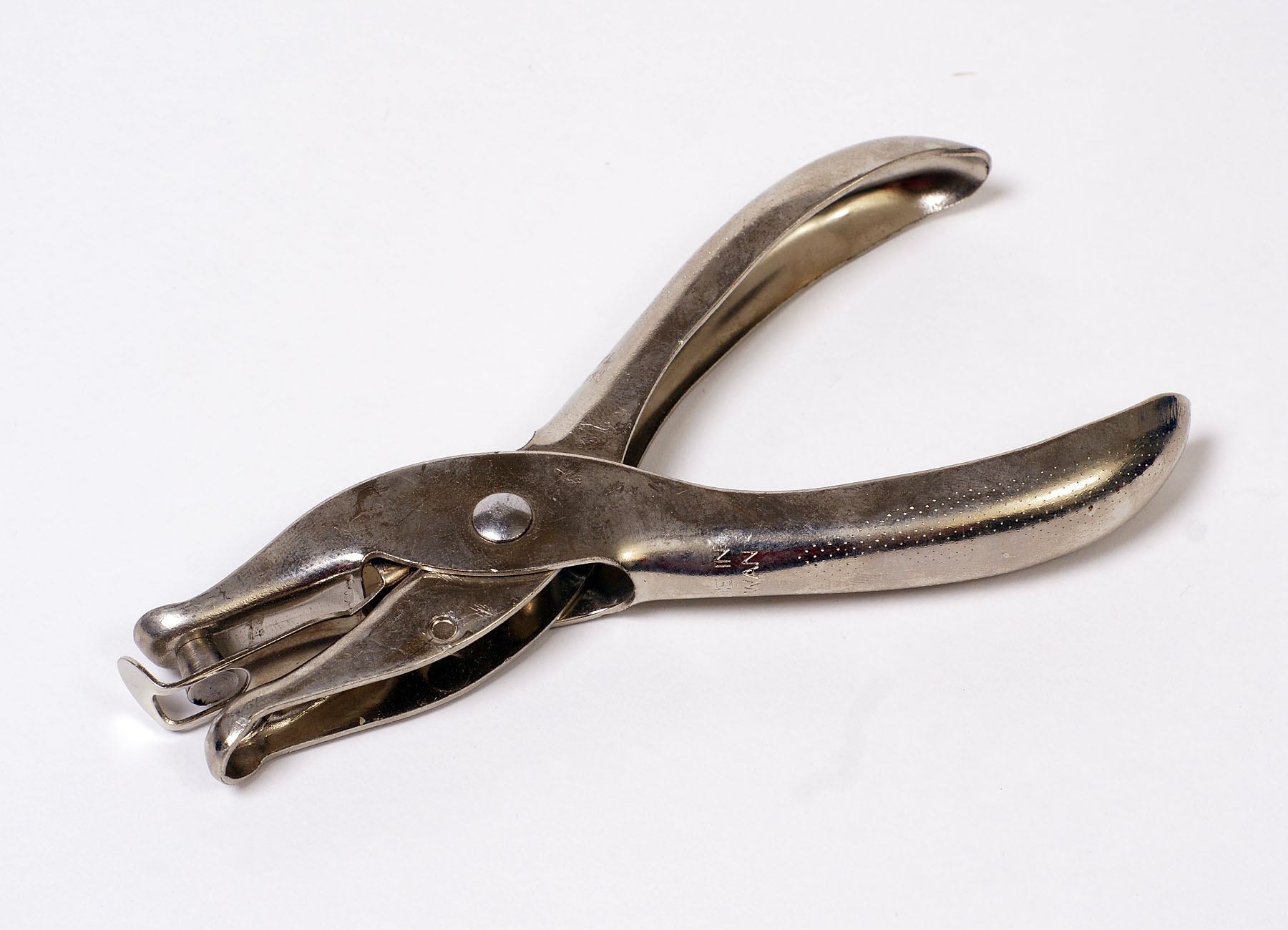
Common handheld single-hole punch

A single-hole punch makes a single hole per activation, usually at an arbitrary position (i.e., without alignment guides).

Single-hole punches are often used to punch an admission ticket or other document to indicate it has been used or processed. A specialized ticket punch may be used for this purpose. Some ticket punches have a longer reach/depth (allowing for a particular spot on the ticket to be punched), or punch a particular shape instead of a round hole.

Single-hole punches are often used to punch holes through old playing cards at casinos, marking them as "used" or "canceled". This helps cut down on cheating by eliminating any cards that may have been tainted by players.

Single-hole punches are widely used in the British Civil Service where papers are punched with a single hole in the upper left, and secured using a treasury tag.

Single-hole punches can also be used for binding, with a single loose binding ring, although this is much less common than with ring binders.

Single-hole punches can also be used to make confetti for scrapbooks and other crafting.

==== Eyelet punch ====
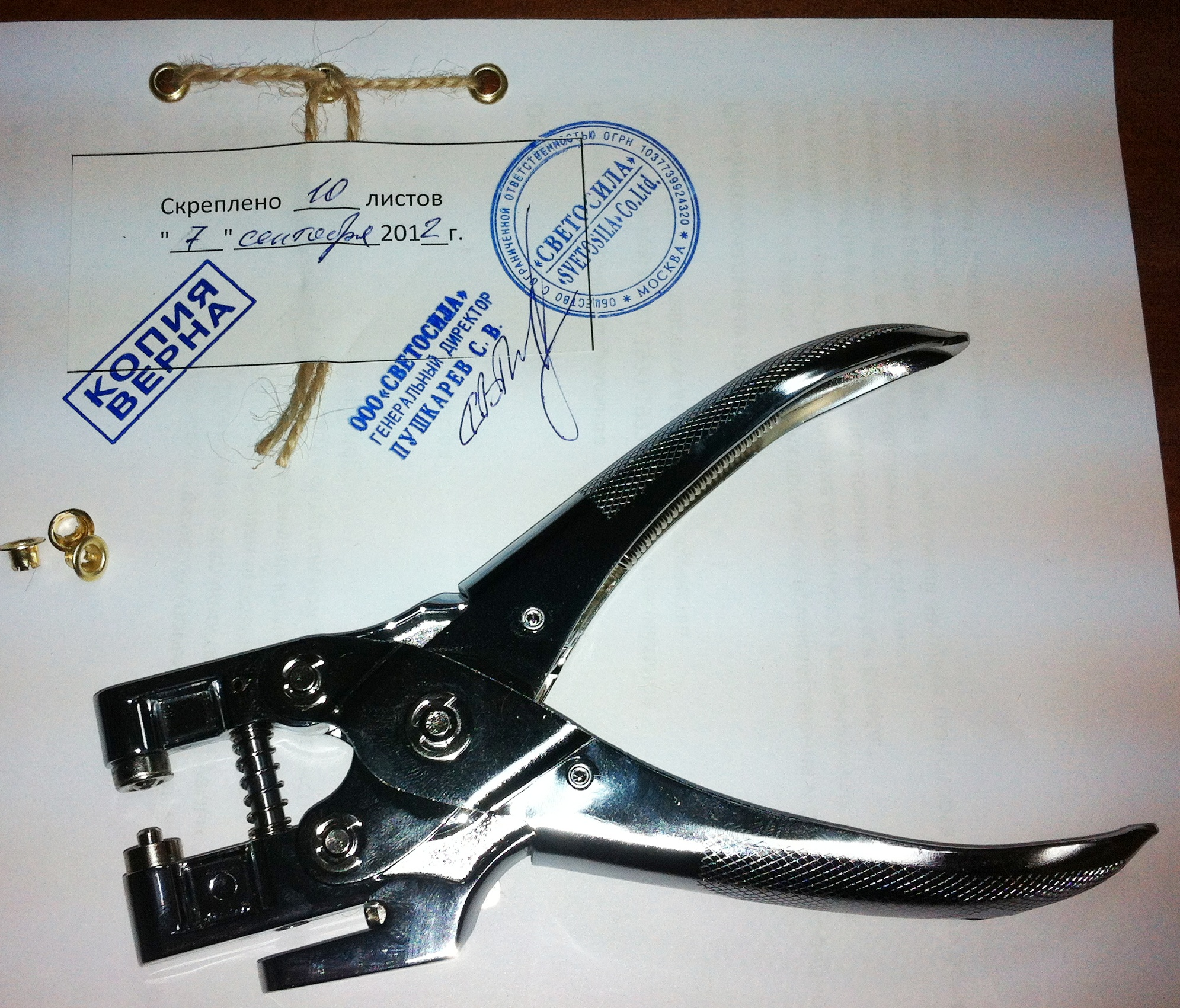
Eyelet punch press

A related office tool is the eyelet punch. This is a single-hole punch which also crimps a metal fastening loop around the hole, similar to a rivet. It is used to permanently secure a few sheets of paper together.

A similar tool, generally known as a holing pincer, is used in animal husbandry. A common application is to attach an ear tag to a livestock animal.

==== Paper tape repair punch ====
Specialized hand-operated tape punches were used to perform small edits and repairs on punched paper tapes used for data entry into teletypes or early computers. Torn or damaged tapes were sometimes aligned with specialized jigs, spliced with special adhesive tape, and the holes encoding data were manually restored using such punches. The ASCII character code included a special DELETE or DEL character defined as all holes punched out (code 7F), allowing an erroneous character to be canceled by punching extra holes.

As punched tape technology became obsolescent in the 1980s, the manual tape repair tools became rare.

=== Multiple-hole punches ===
Multiple-hole punches typically place a pattern of holes along one edge of sheets of paper, allowing the pages to be bound together.

The most common use for multi-hole punched paper is with a ring binder. A book-like cover is fitted with retaining rings matching the pattern of the punched holes. The rings may be split open, paper sheets threaded onto them, and then the rings closed again.

A related filing option is the presentation folder, which secures punched sheets with built-in prongs or fasteners aligned to common two- or three-hole patterns.

A variety of hole patterns are in use for ring bindings. In much of the world, two-hole and four-hole punches consistent with ISO 838 are the norm. In the US, the three-hole punch is most common. See § Standards.

There are other binding techniques which use hole punching. Coil binding uses a spring-like coil, threaded into the punched holes. Comb binding uses a plastic strip with "fingers" that clip into the punched holes. Both use their own types of specialized hole punches. Comb binding typically punches 19 or 23 rectangular holes (for letter and A4 paper sizes, respectively).

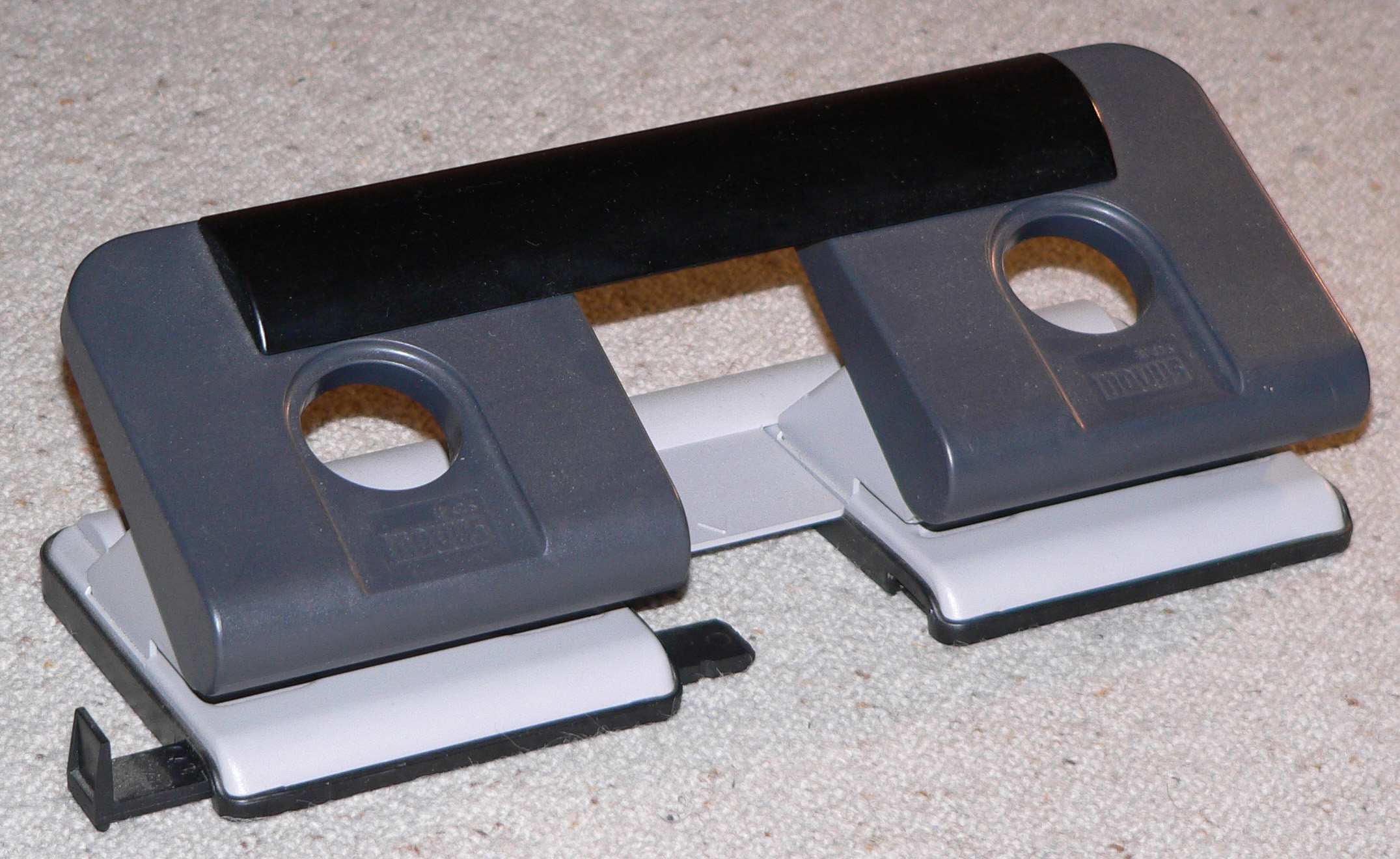
German four-hole punch

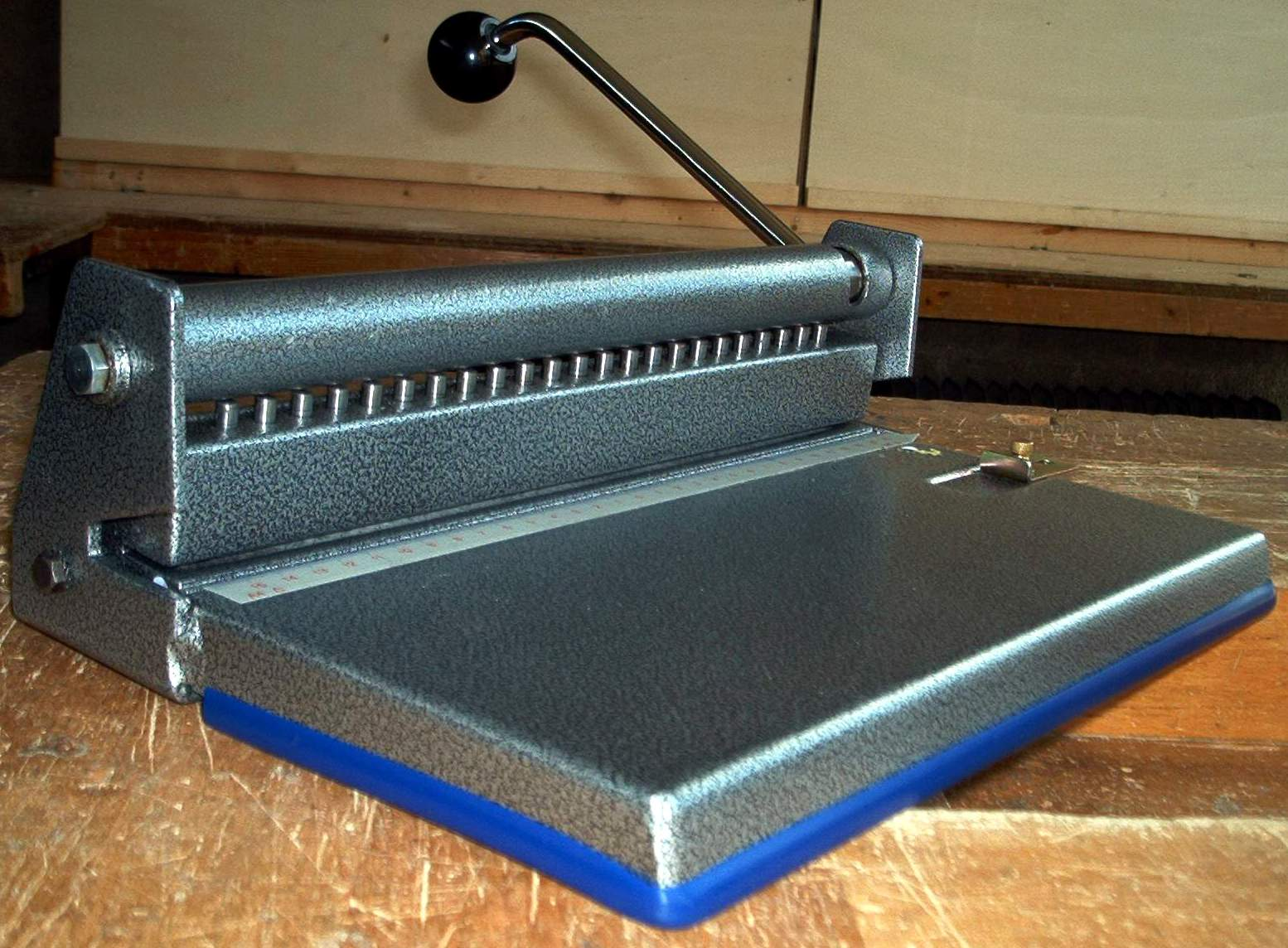
23-hole punch

==== Hole punch for discbound notebooks ====
A hole punch does not necessarily make round or square holes in a sheet of paper; instead, it may create certain shapes along the edge of the sheet. This is seen in discbound notebook systems, where loose leaves are bound together using plastic discs. For more information on loose leaf systems, see Loose leaf.

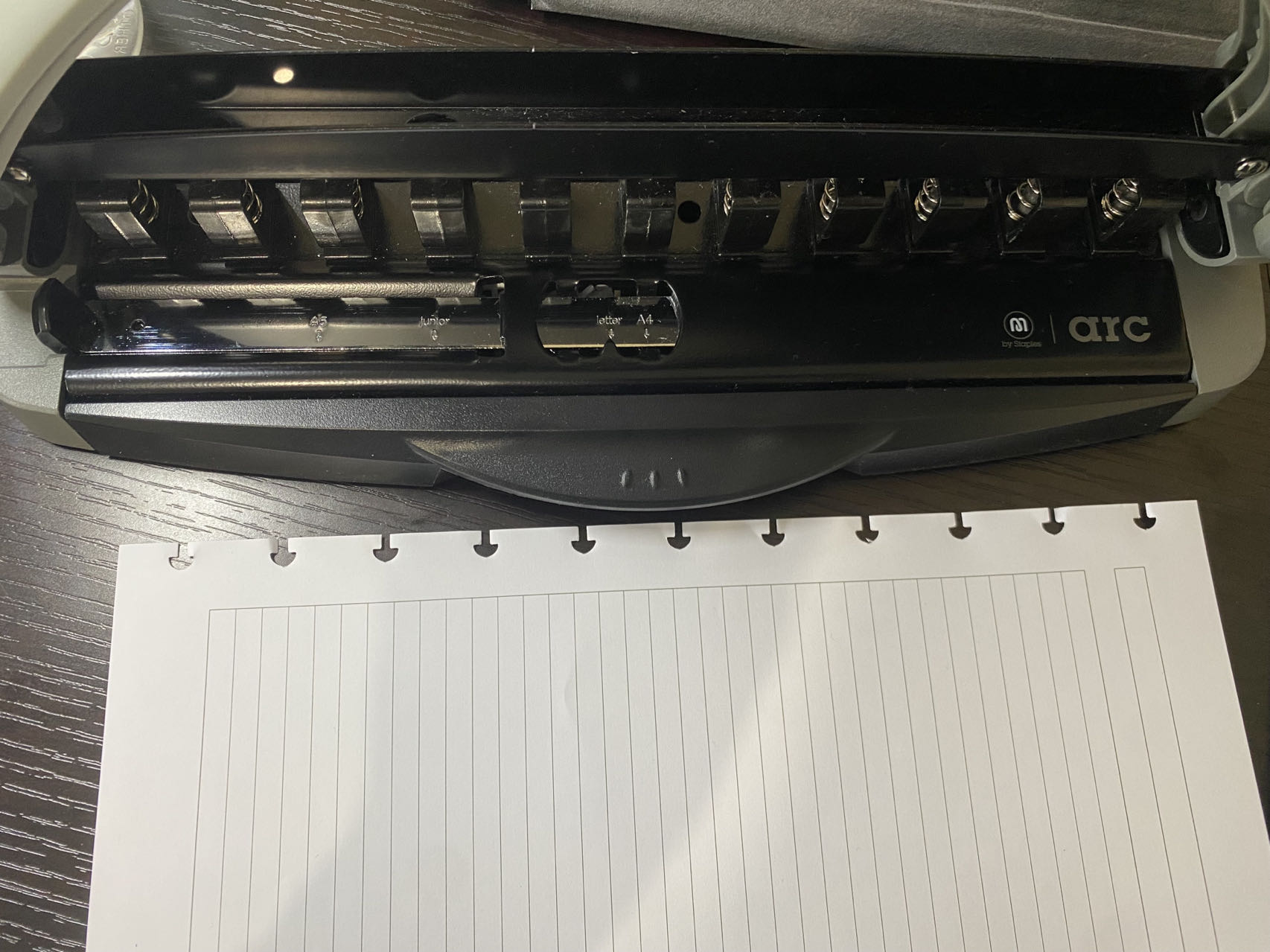
ARC hole punch for ARC discbound notebook system

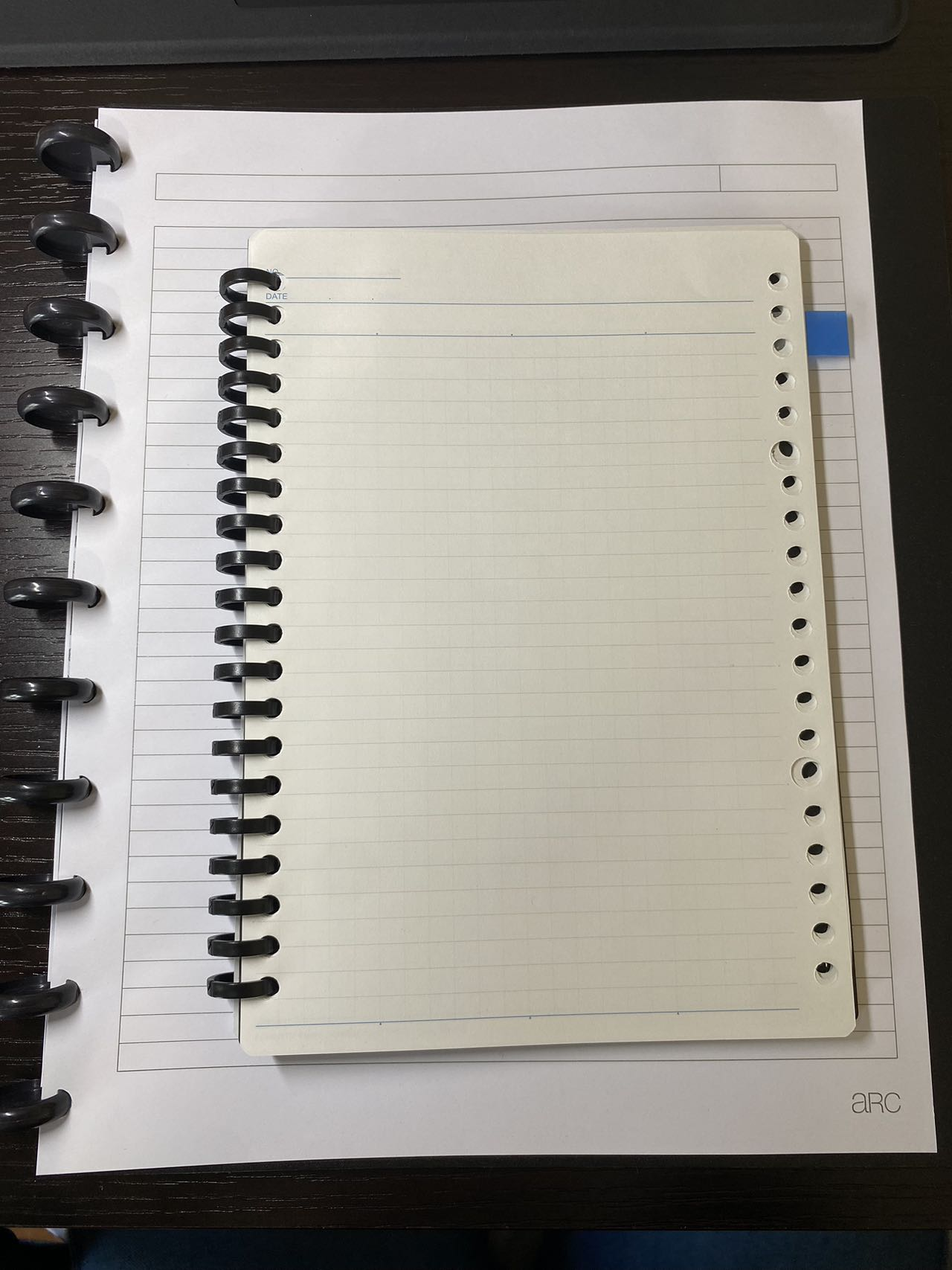
Binder-based and discbound loose leaf systems

== History ==
The origins of the hole punch date back to Germany; Friedrich Soennecken filed his patent on 14 November 1886, for his Papierlocher für Sammelmappen, a multiple-hole punch and office supply product. A Google Doodle was used on 14 November 2017 to celebrate the 131st anniversary of the hole punch.

The first record for a single-hole puncher—a ticket punch—was published in 1885, when Benjamin Smith helped create a spring-loaded hole puncher that had a receptacle to collect the chads. Smith dubbed it the "conductor's punch". A later paper punch was refined in 1893 by Charles Brooks, and it was referred to as a ticket punch due to its early role in punching train tickets as trains became increasingly popular and common between 1850 and 1900.

== Standards ==
Multiple standards exist for the number and position of holes on multi-punched sheets.

=== International ===
==== ISO 838 ====
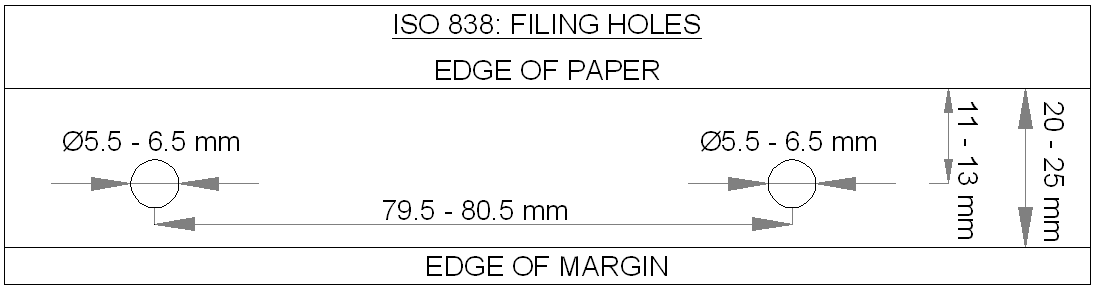
ISO 838 template

International Standard ISO 838 specifies two holes, with centers 80±0.5 mm apart, and located 12±1 mm from the nearest edge of the paper, and with the pair of holes positioned symmetrically along that edge. Each hole is to have a diameter of 6±0.5 mm. Any paper format that is at least 100 mm high can be filed using this system (e.g., ISO A7 and larger). A printed document with a margin of 20–25 mm will accommodate ISO 838 filing holes.

==== 4-hole or 888 ====
A four-hole extension to ISO 838 is also in common use. Two holes are punched in accordance with the standard, plus two additional holes located 80 mm to the outside of the standard holes. The two additional holes provide more stability in 4-ring binders, while still allowing 4-hole paper to fit 2-ring binders. This extension is sometimes referred to as the "888" system because of the three 8 cm gaps between the holes. (NB: Referring to this de-facto standard as "ISO 888" is inaccurate, since the actual ISO 888 standard concerns fasteners, not holes in paper.) Some 2-hole punches have an "888" marking on their paper guide, to assist punching all four holes into A4 paper.

Konica Minolta specifies that for European 4-hole arrangements, all holes should be 11±1 mm from the nearest (i.e. long/spine) edge of the paper, which is slightly at variance with ISO 838's specification of 12±1 mm.

=== ANSI paper sizes ===
The United States and a few other countries use non-ISO paper standards, defined in ANSI/ASME Y14.1 and other intra-nation standards. Unlike ISO 838, there appears to be no well-established official specification for ANSI paper hole patterns, and instead they are de facto standards, established by custom and tradition.

The diameter of the holes varies between manufacturers, with typical values being 1/4 to 5/16 inch (6 to 8 mm). The 5/16 value is most commonly used, as it allows for looser tolerances in both ring binder and paper punching. The distance to the paper edge also varies, with 1/2 inch (13 mm) hole-center-to-edge being typical. Konica-Minolta specifies 9.5±1 mm for both two and three-hole variants in North America.

==== US letter 3-hole system ====
For the US letter paper size (8 1/2 by 11 inches, 220 by 280 mm), a three-hole standard is widely used. The holes are positioned symmetrically, with the centers 4 1/4 inches (108 mm) apart. It requires paper formats that are at least 9 1/2 inches (241 mm) high. There is a variant for half-letter size pages (8 1/2 by 5 1/2 inches or 220 mm × 140 mm), whose three holes are 2 3/4 inches (70 mm) apart.

==== US legal 4-hole system ====
For US legal paper size (8 1/2 by 14 inches, 220 by 360 mm), a 4-hole system exists. It is still in use today, but is not as common as the 3-hole standard. The four holes are positioned symmetrically with centers 3 1/2 inches (89 mm) apart. The four binding positions provide more support for the longer 14-inch side of legal paper.

==== 2-hole filebinder ====
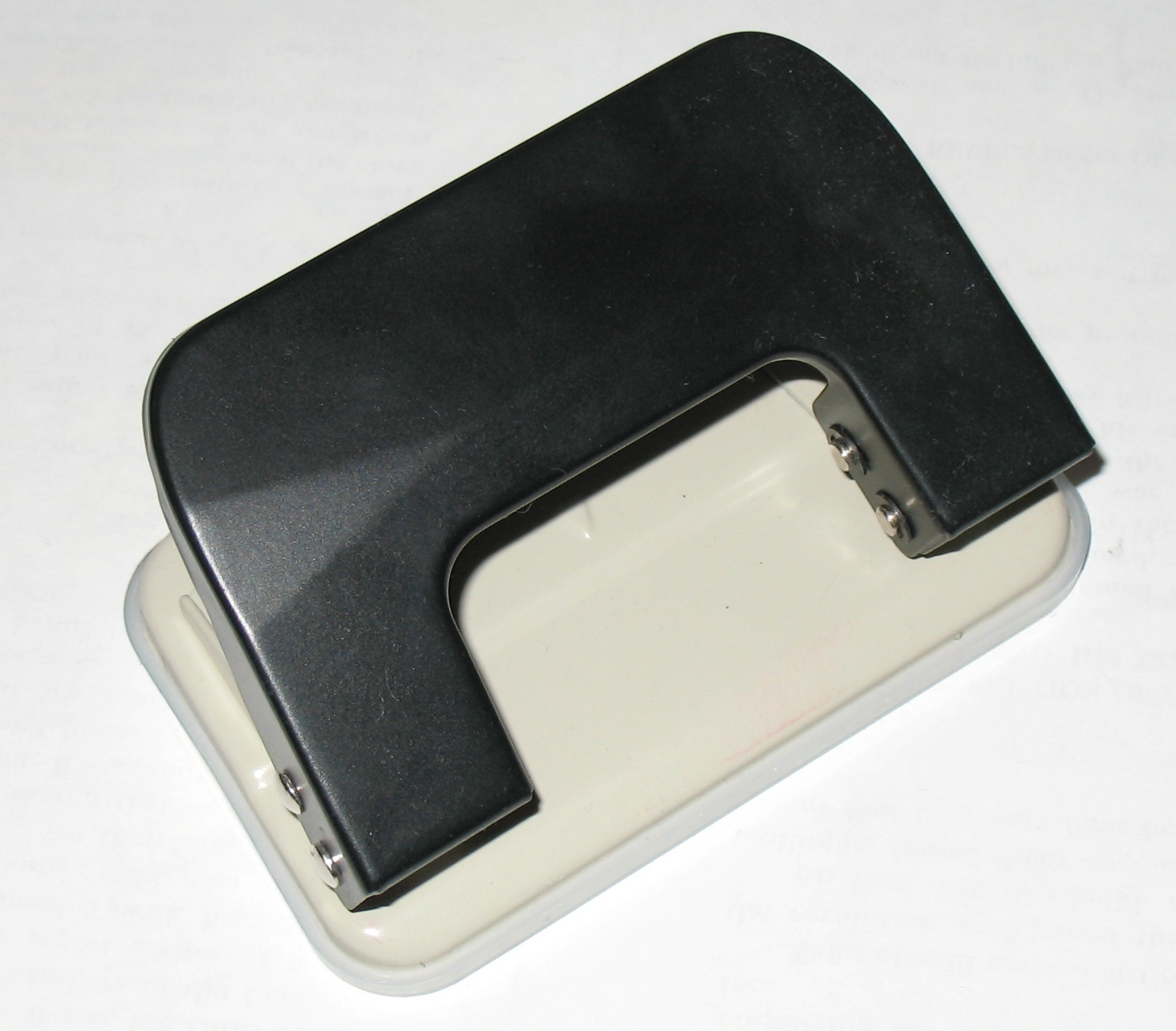
Two-hole filebinder hole punch

Another standard also occasionally used in the US is a "filebinder" system. Its two holes are positioned symmetrically, each 2 3/4 inches (70 mm) apart from the center, i.e. 5 1/2 inches (140 mm) apart from each other. This matches the half-letter 3-hole system, except that the middle hole is omitted.

=== Swedish triohålning ===
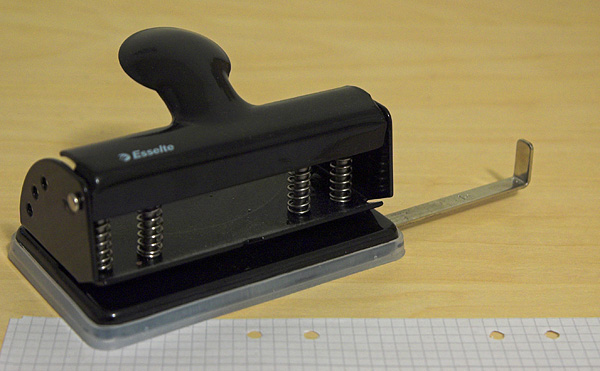
Triohålning punch and punched paper

In Sweden, a four-hole national standard is almost exclusively used. The centers of the holes are 21 mm, 70 mm and 21 mm apart, 10.5±0.5 mm from the edge of the paper. These holes fit on the longer side of an A6, though it is usually used for A4 papers.

The official name of this four-hole system is triohålning, since it was adapted to the "Trio binder" which was awarded Swedish patent in 1890. The binder's inventor, Andreas Tengwall, supposedly named it after a consortium consisting of himself and two companions, i.e. a trio.

Most trio-styled hole punches have an extendable meter where you can specify the page size (e.g. A4, A5 or A6). Putting the top of the page at the meter edge centers the holes on a paper of specified size. Thus, the same hole punch can be used for papers and binders of varying sizes (A6 or larger). It also means that for example an A6 sheet can be inserted centered into an A4 folder.

Trio-styled binders don't have rings where related guide-pins meet in the middle of the binder. Rather, all guide pins go all the way through a closed binder and are attached to either side of the binder. The inner holes have guide pins from one side (usually the back), and the outer holes have pins from the other side. A full binder can in this way be opened in the front or the back and rely on full-length guide pins (either the inner or outer holes). This way, it is also possible to easily turn over the leaves of an open binder without closing it fully. By gently closing the binder half way such that the guide-pins from either side overlap slightly, a page will be able to slide from one side of the binder to the other without manually fitting guide pins into the punched holes.

=== Dutch 23-ring system ===
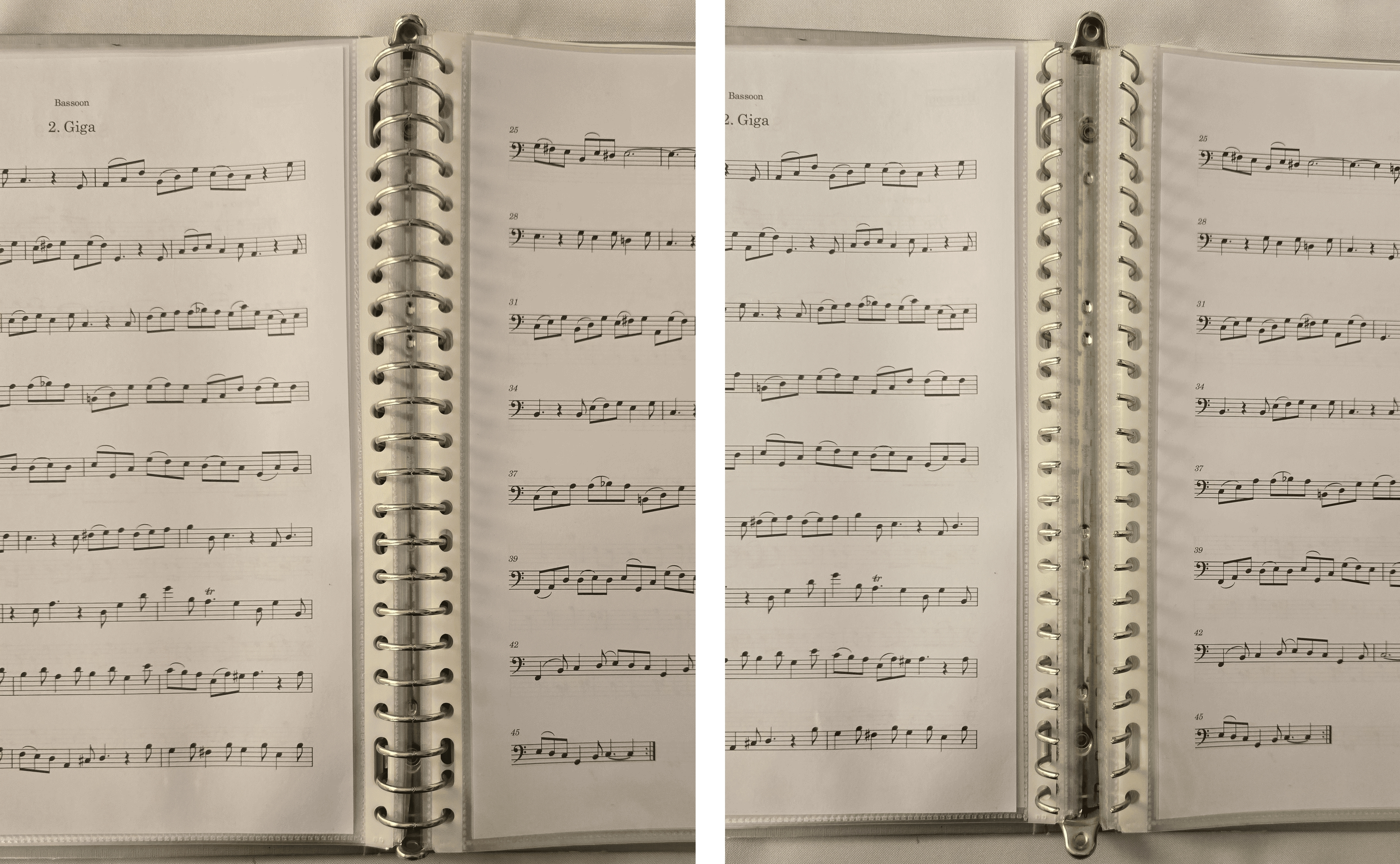
Dutch "Multo" 23-ring binder showing rings closed and open

In The Netherlands, a 23-ring system is common, alongside the more familiar 4-ring (and to a lesser extent) 2-ring systems. The centers of the holes are 12.7 mm apart. This is half-inch spacing, and is because the predecessor 17-hole system (now little used) was a US patent.

Originally a system patented as Multo in the 1970s, Dutch people often refer to it as Multomap (‘Multo binder’) irrespective of the brand, and sometimes, by extension, to any ring binder. This usage is so common that multomap appears in the official spelling list of the Dutch language, and the Van Dale Dutch–English dictionary gives its translation as ‘ring binder’.

The punches are much heavier and more expensive than comparable 4-hole punches, and are normally to be found in schools and offices, rather than in domestic settings, though there are lightweight models, that accept a single sheet of paper. For this reason it is common to use polypropylene prepunched pockets rather than punch the pages.

=== Others ===
- The Filofax system uses six holes in two groups of three.

=== Hole spacing chart ===
Commonly used hole patterns for hole punches and ring binders

== Gallery ==
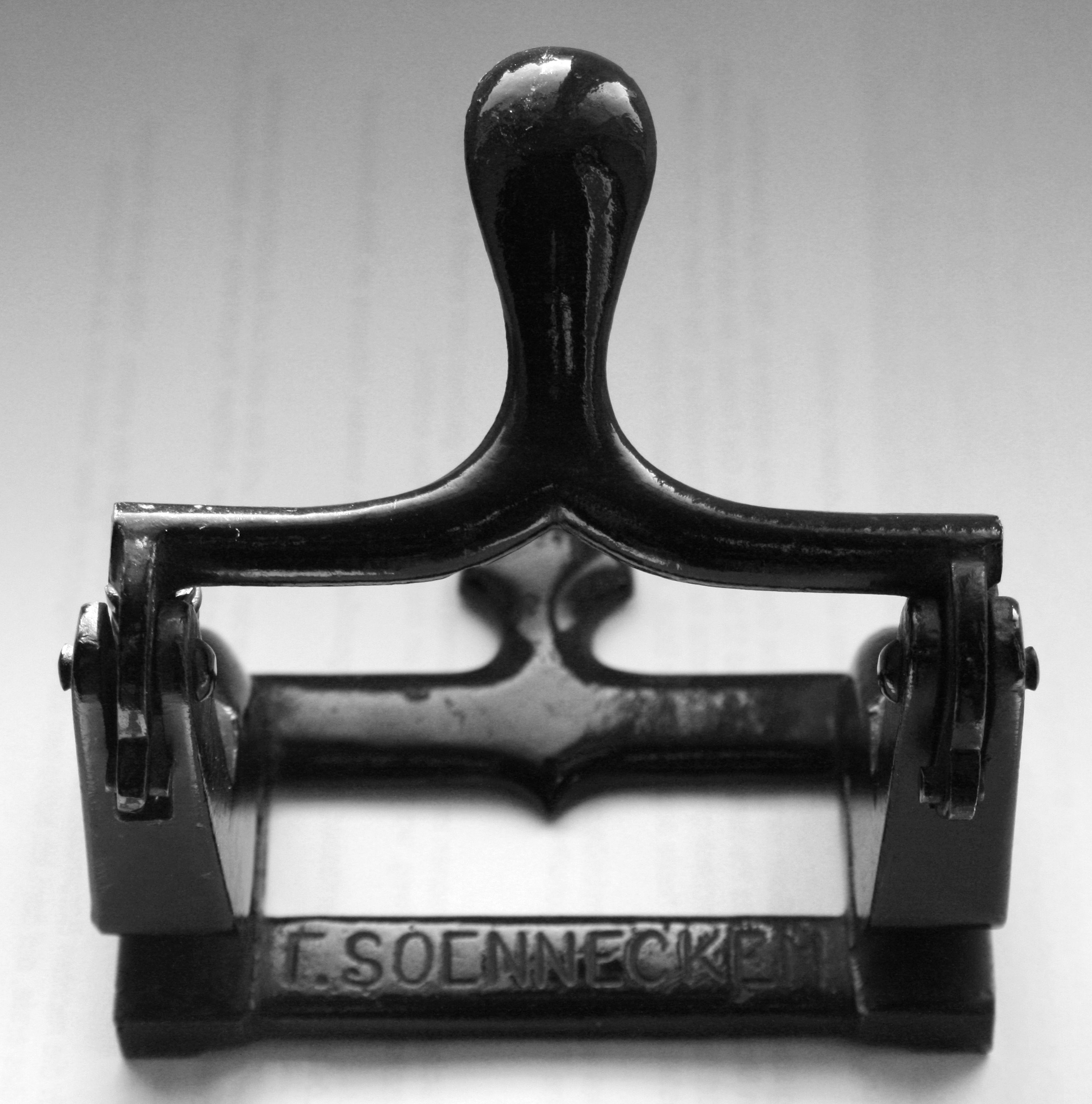
Antique Soennecken hole punch

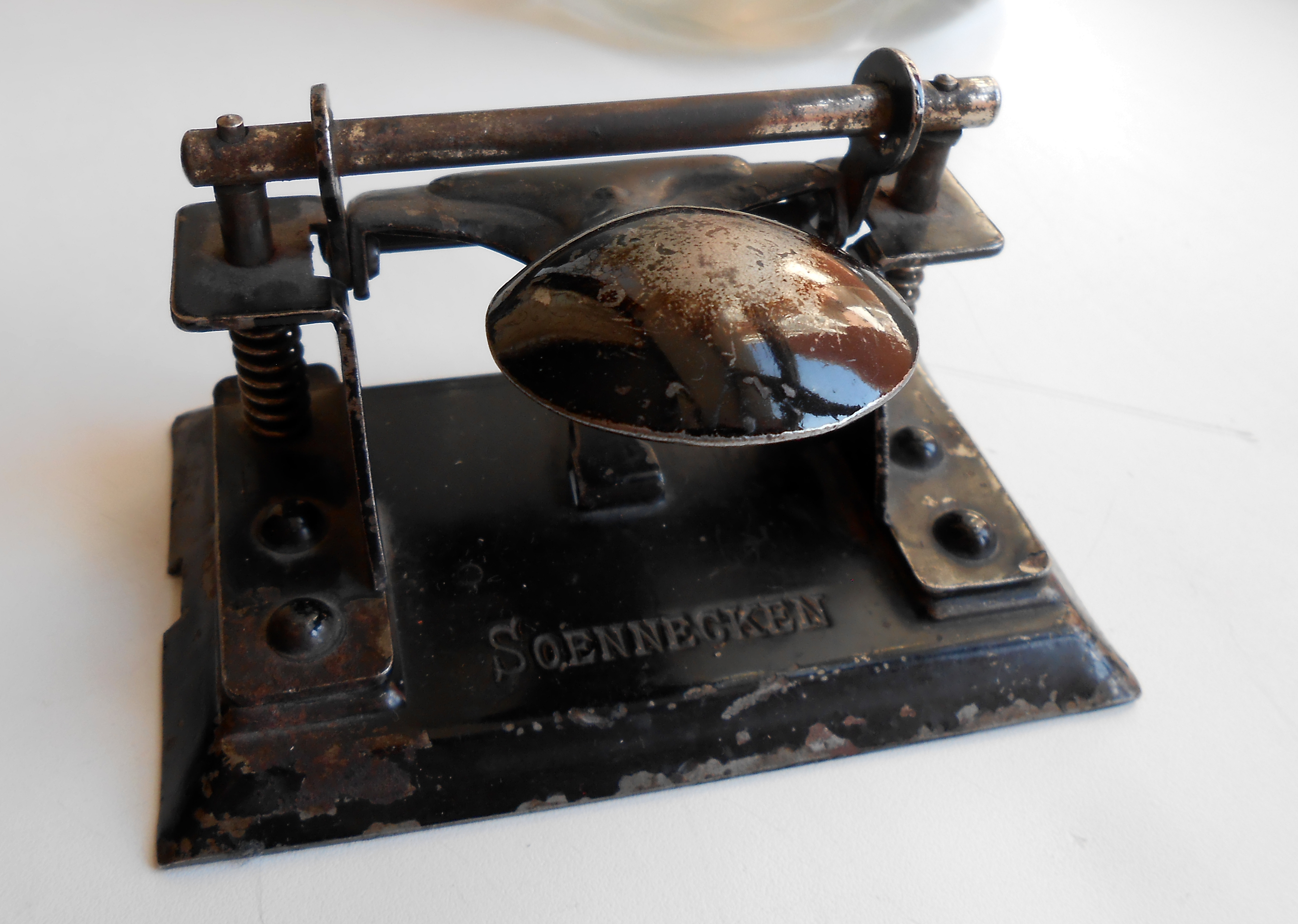
Antique heavy-duty Soennecken hole punch

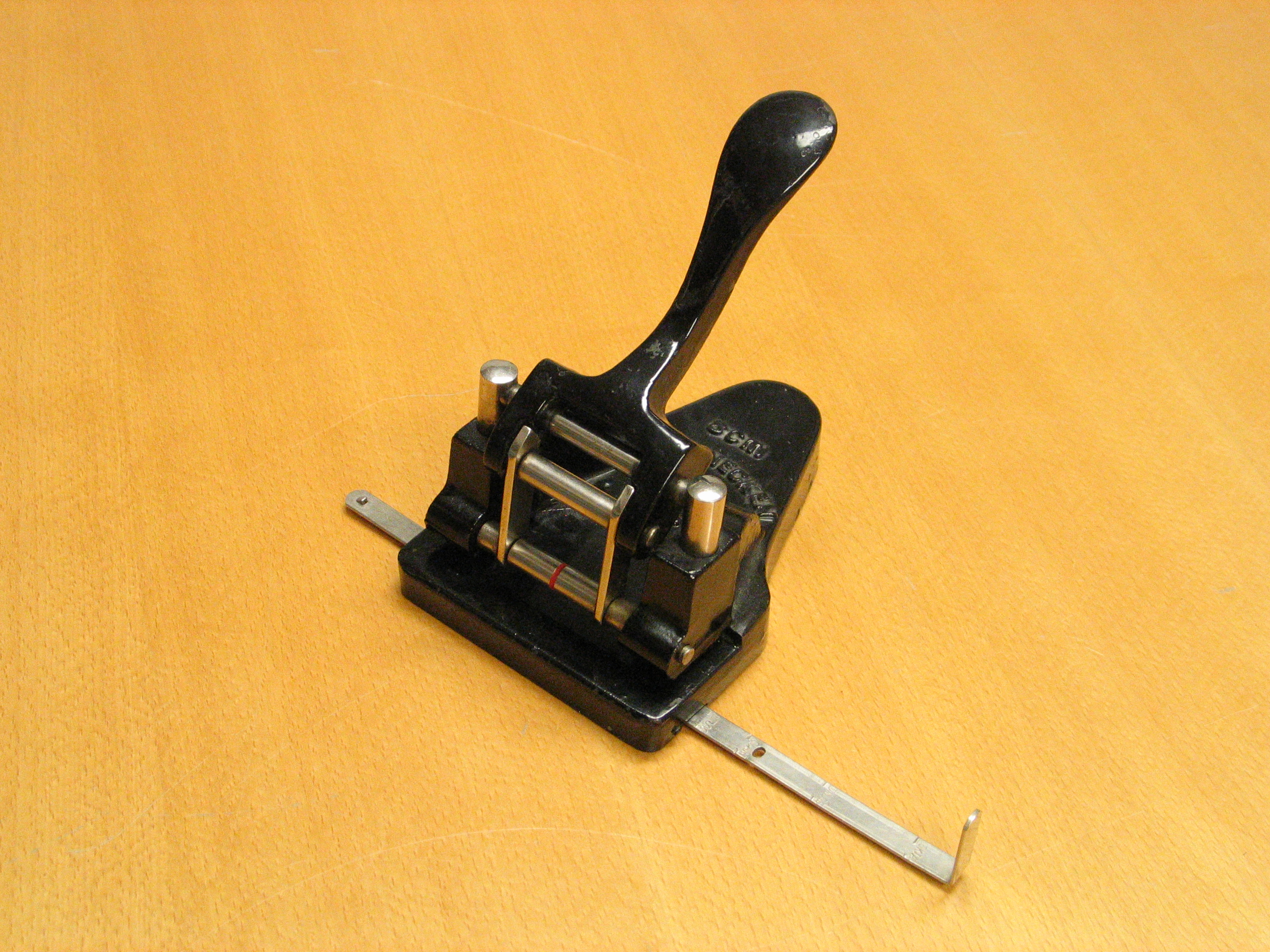
Swedish hole punch

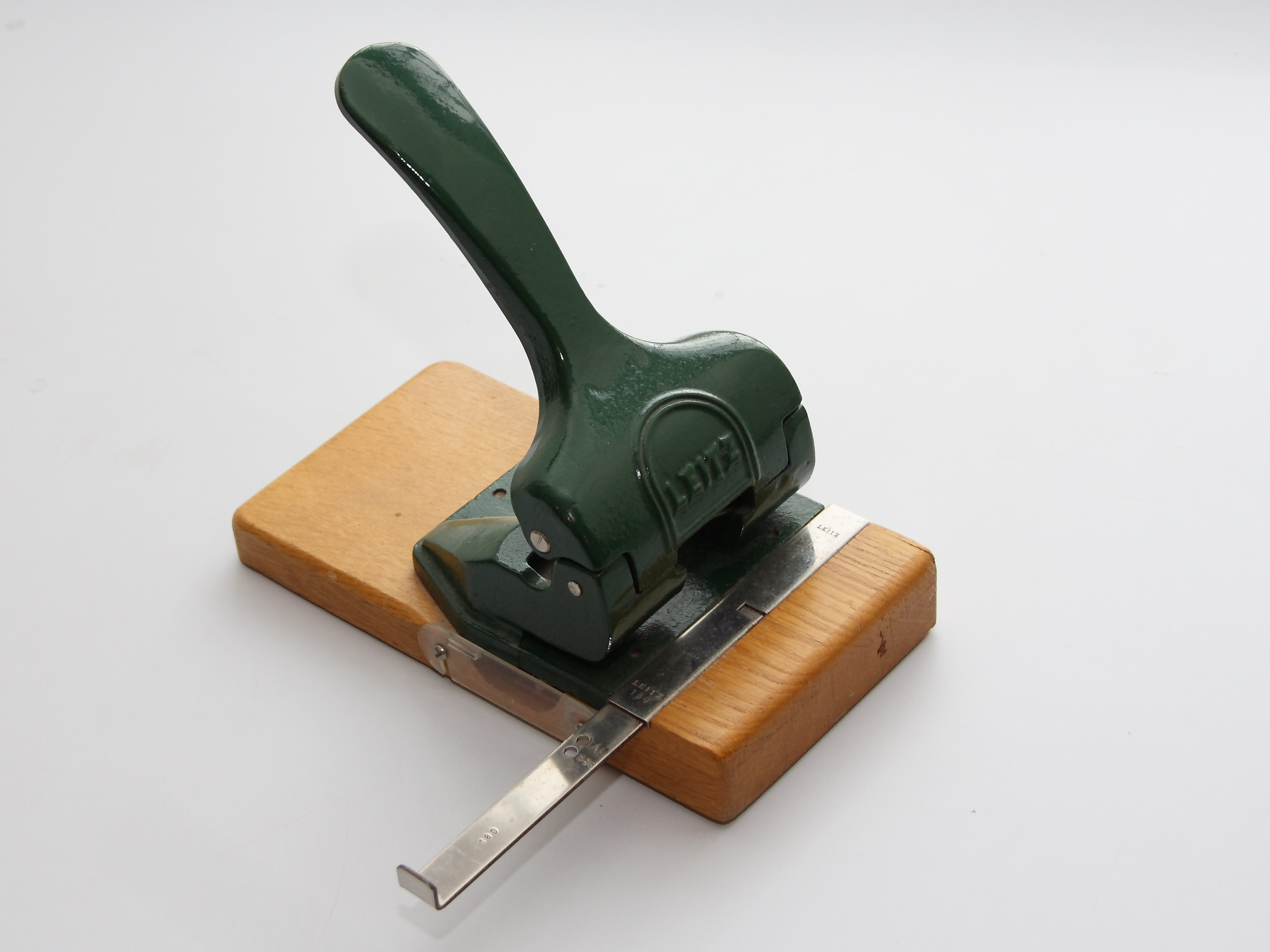
German Leitz hole punch

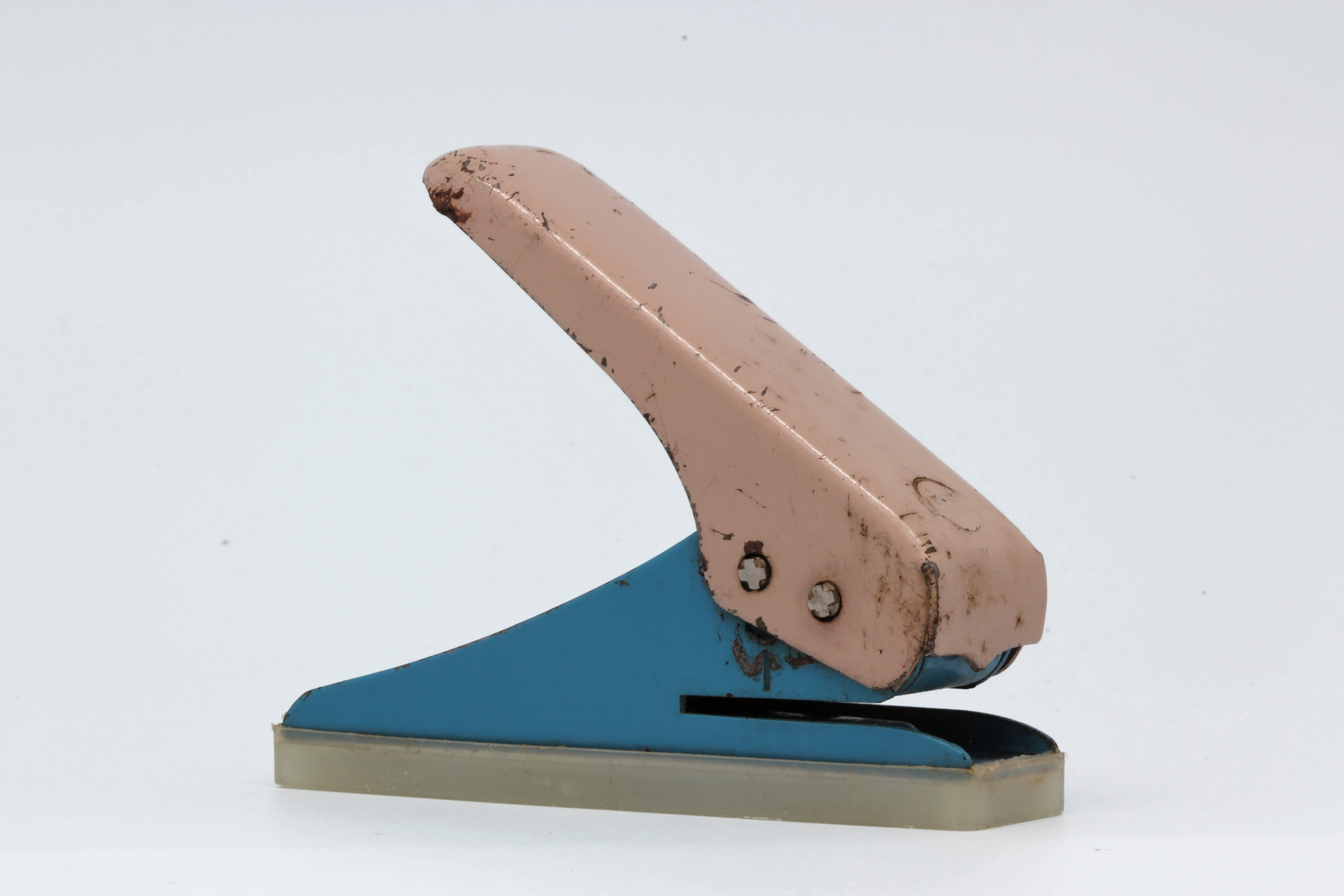
Japanese single-hole punch

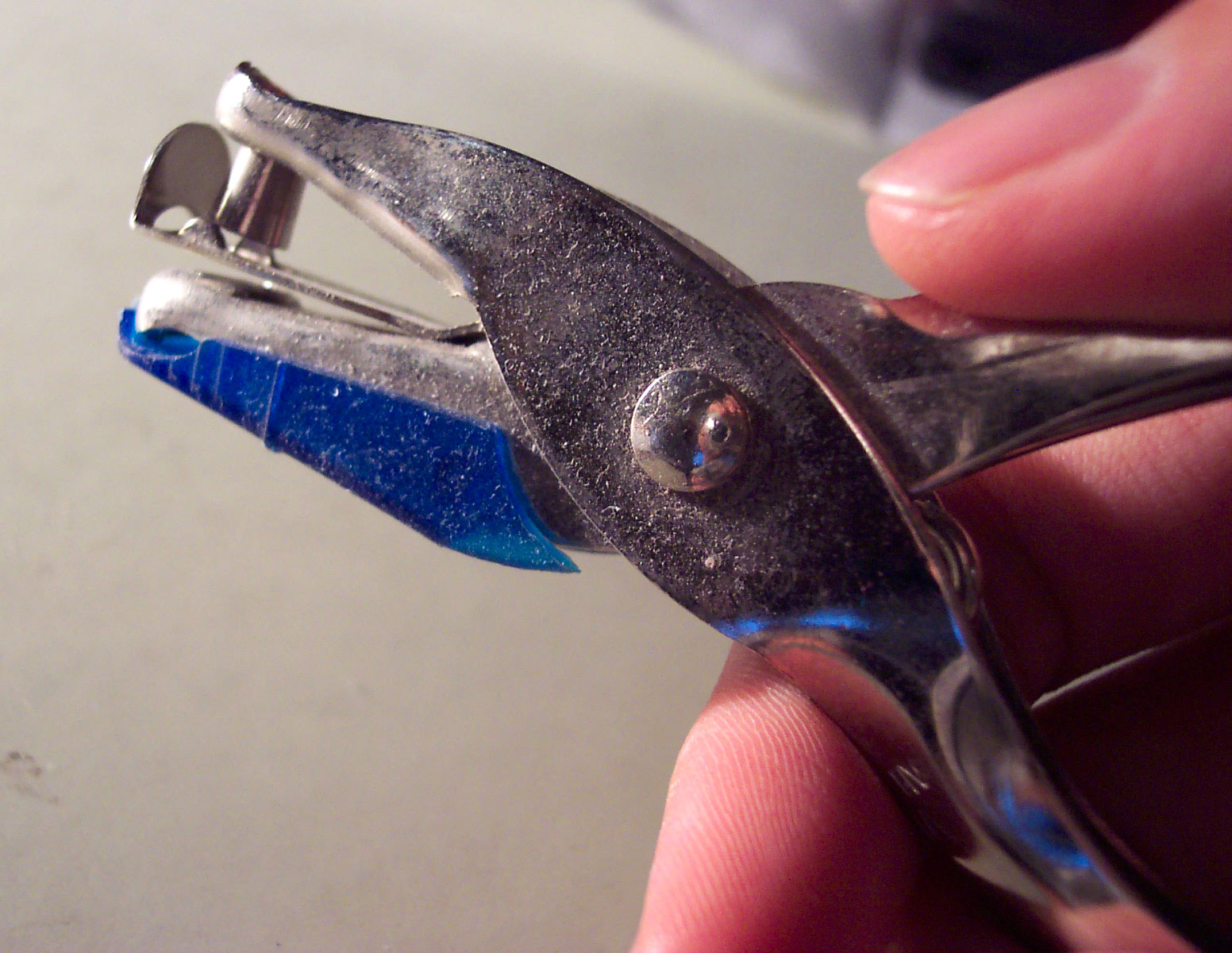
Closeup of punch with blue plastic chad collector

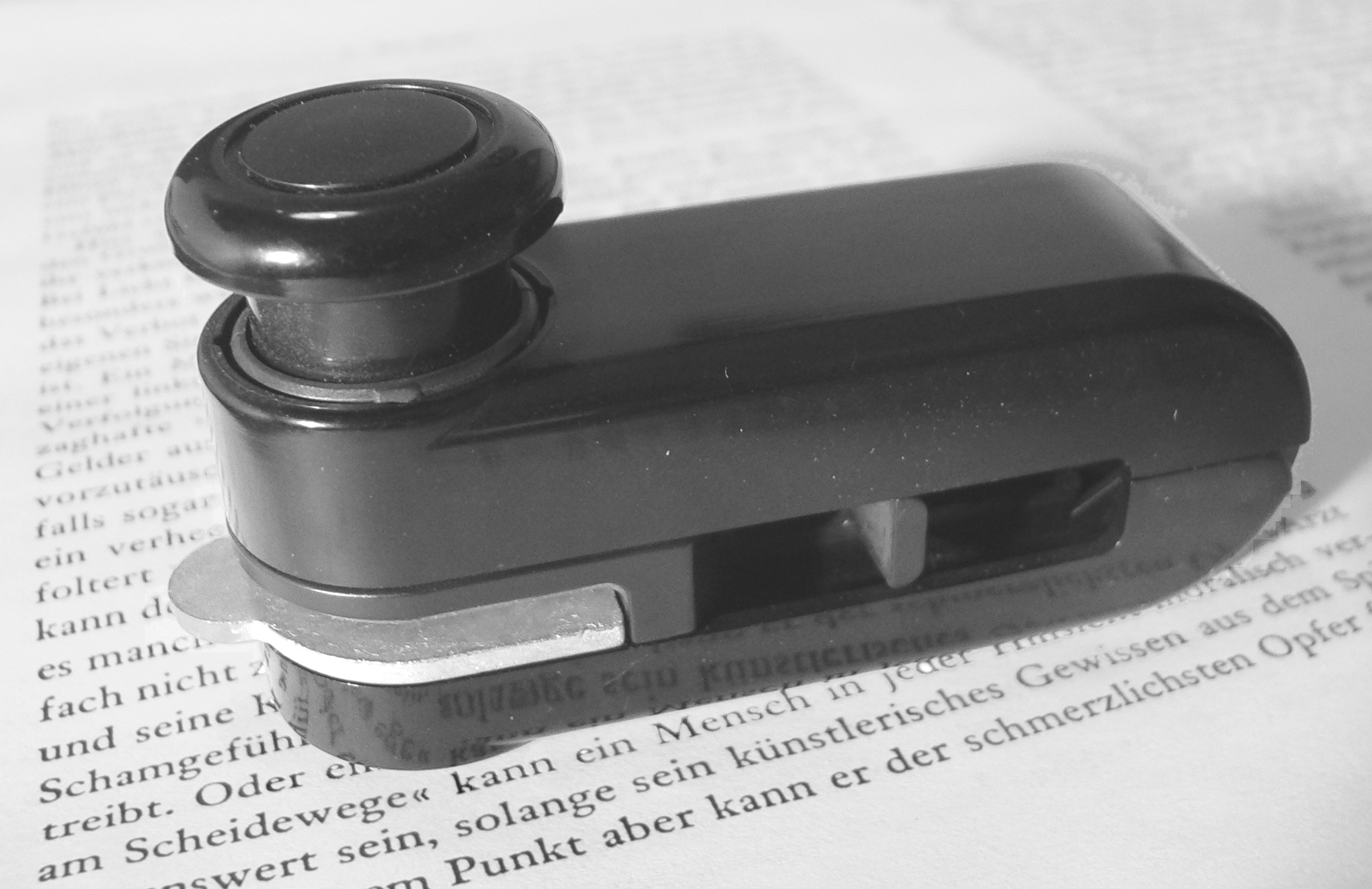
Single-hole punch for paper

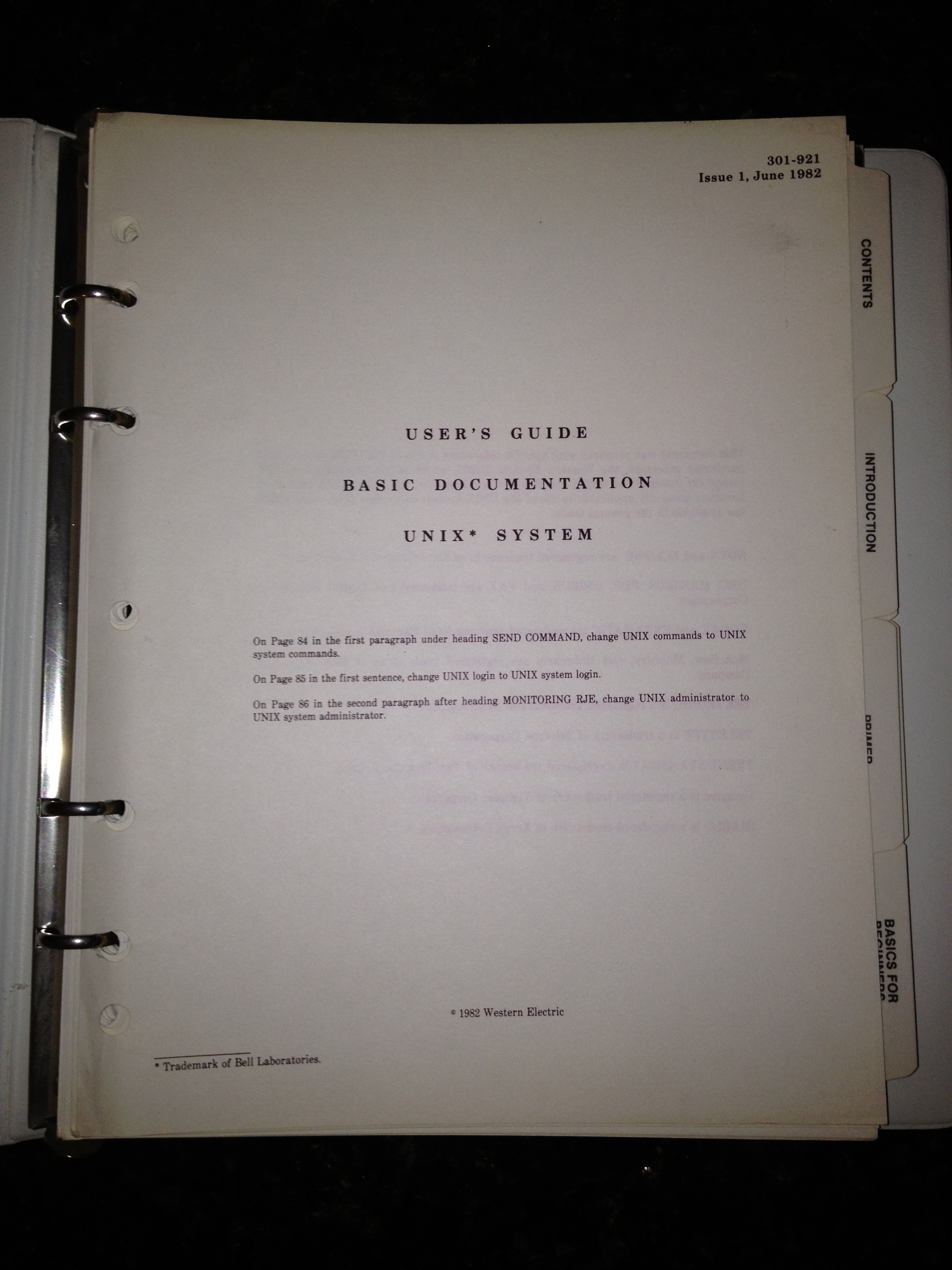
Paper punched with 7 holes, in a 4-ring binder

A hole punch in use

== See also ==
- Ticket punch
- Needle punch
- Chad (paper)
- Paper drilling
- Ring binder
- Loose leaf
- Punched card
- Punched tape
- Punching
- Hole Punch (Mario)
