= Confetti =

Piece of paper or mylar used for celebration

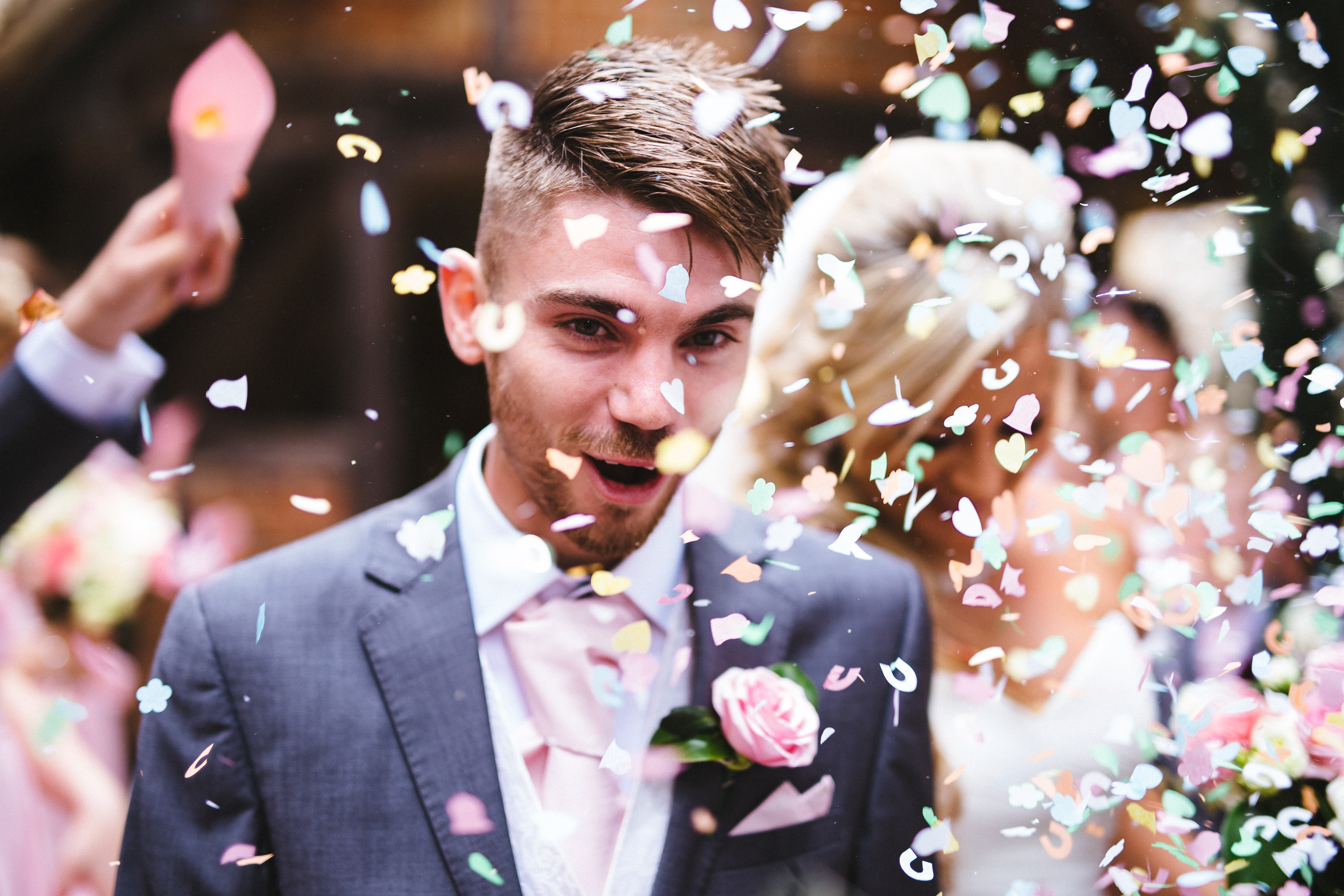
Paper confetti being thrown at a wedding in the United Kingdom

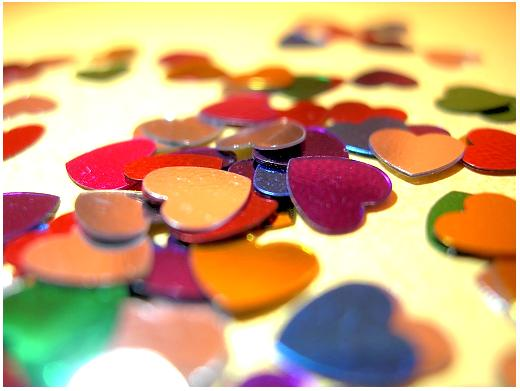
A scattering of metallic confetti

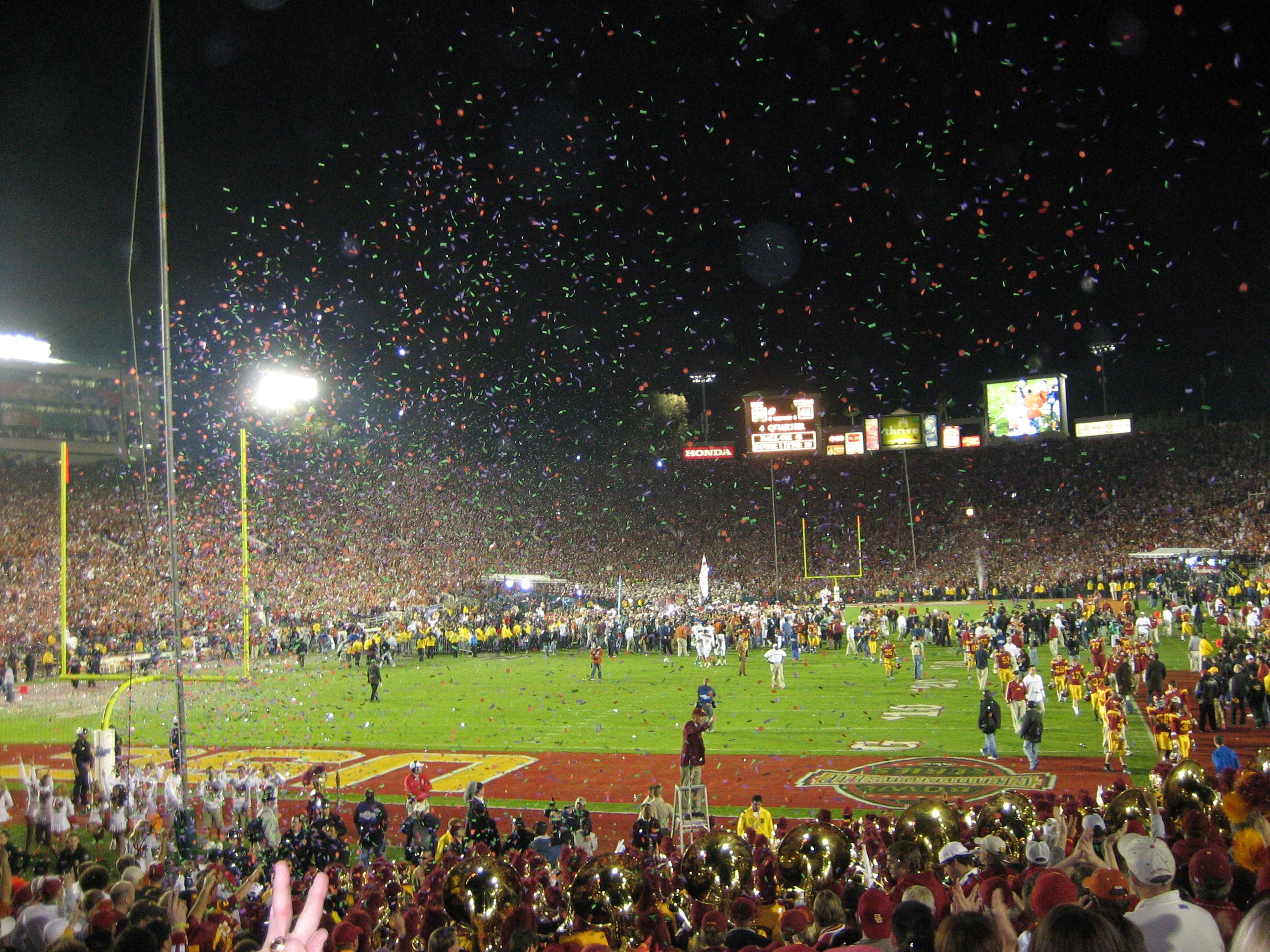
Confetti falls down on the Rose Bowl field after the victory of the Longhorns against the Trojans at the 2006 Rose Bowl, which was played on the 4 January 2006 (NCAA game), part of its post-game celebration

Confetti are small pieces or streamers of paper, mylar or metallic material, usually thrown at celebrations, especially parties, parades or weddings. The word derives from the plural of Italian confetto, a small sweet. Modern paper confetti trace back to symbolic rituals of tossing grains and sweets during special occasions, traditional for numerous cultures throughout history as an ancient custom dating back to pagan times, but adapted from sweets and grains to paper through the centuries.

Confetti are manufactured in multiple colors, shapes and materials. A distinction is made between confetti and glitter; glitter is smaller than confetti (pieces usually no larger than 1 mm) and is universally shiny. Most table confetti is also shiny. While they are called metallic confetti they are actually metallized PVC. Most party supply stores carry paper and metallic confetti. Confetti are commonly used at social gatherings such as parties, weddings, and Bar Mitzvahs. The simplest confetti is simply shredded paper (see ticker-tape parade), and can be made with scissors or a paper shredder. Chads punched out of scrap paper are also common. A hole punch makes small round chads, and a ticket punch makes more elaborate chads. Most pieces of paper flats will flutter as tumblewings giving long flight times.

In the early 21st century, the use of confetti as a cosmetic addition to trophy presentations at sporting events became increasingly common. In this case, larger strips of paper (typically measuring 20 mm × 60 mm) in colors appropriate to the team or celebration are used. For smaller volumes of confetti, ABS or PVC "barrels" are filled and the confetti is projected via a "cannon" (a small pressure vessel) using compressed air or carbon dioxide. For larger venues or volumes of confetti, a venturi air mover powered by carbon dioxide is used to propel significantly larger volumes of confetti greater distances.

== History ==
The throwing of objects at parades is well-documented in Milan from the 14th century. The nobles would throw candies and flowers during the parades, while dames threw eggshells filled with essences and perfumes. Lower-class people mocked the nobles by throwing rotten eggs, and battles among enemy factions or districts became common. In 1597, the city governor Juan Fernández de Velasco y Tovar imposed a ban on egg-throwing and squittaroli (spraying liquids in the street) along with other immoral behaviors. The custom disappeared for about a century, re-emerging in the 1700s in the form of thrown small candies, typically sugar-coated seeds. The seeds used were mostly coriander, a common plant in the area: the Italian name for confetti is coriandoli, from the name of the herb.

The candies were expensive, and the lower classes often used small chalk balls instead, called benis de gess (chalk candy). Those were officially defined as the only material allowed to be thrown during the parades in an edict by the Prefect of Milan in 1808, but the battles fought with them in the 1800s became too large and dangerous, with hundreds of people involved, leading to a ban of the chalk pellets. Some circumvented the ban by throwing balls of mud.

== Italian confetti ==
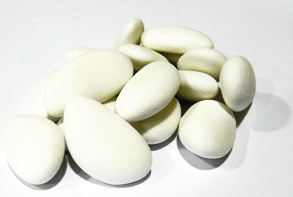
Confetti di Sulmona

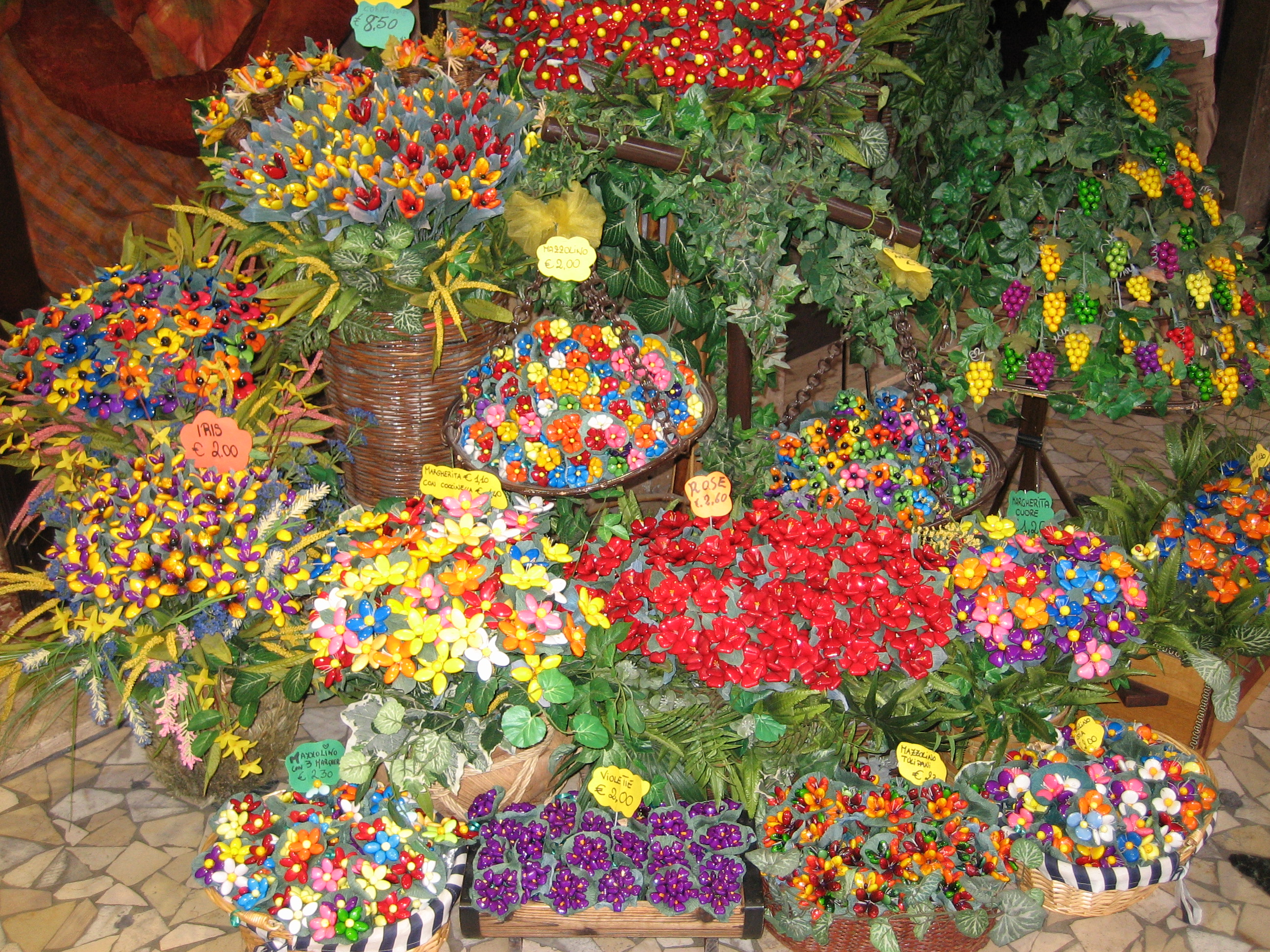
Confetti di Sulmona fashioned into flowers

The English word confetti (to denote Jordan almonds) is adopted from the Italian confectionery of the same name, which was a small sweet traditionally thrown during carnivals. Also known as dragée or comfit, Italian confetti are almonds with a hard sugar coating. The Italian word for paper confetti is coriandoli, which refers to the coriander seeds originally contained within the sweet.

By tradition, Italian confetti (sugar coated almonds) are given out at weddings (white coating) and baptisms (blue or pink coating, according to the sex of the newborn baby) or graduations (red coating), often wrapped in a small tulle bag as a gift to the guests.

== See also ==
Media related to Confetti at Wikimedia Commons The dictionary definition of confetti at Wiktionary

- Confetti candy
