= Chad (paper) =

Fragments left over from cutting into paper

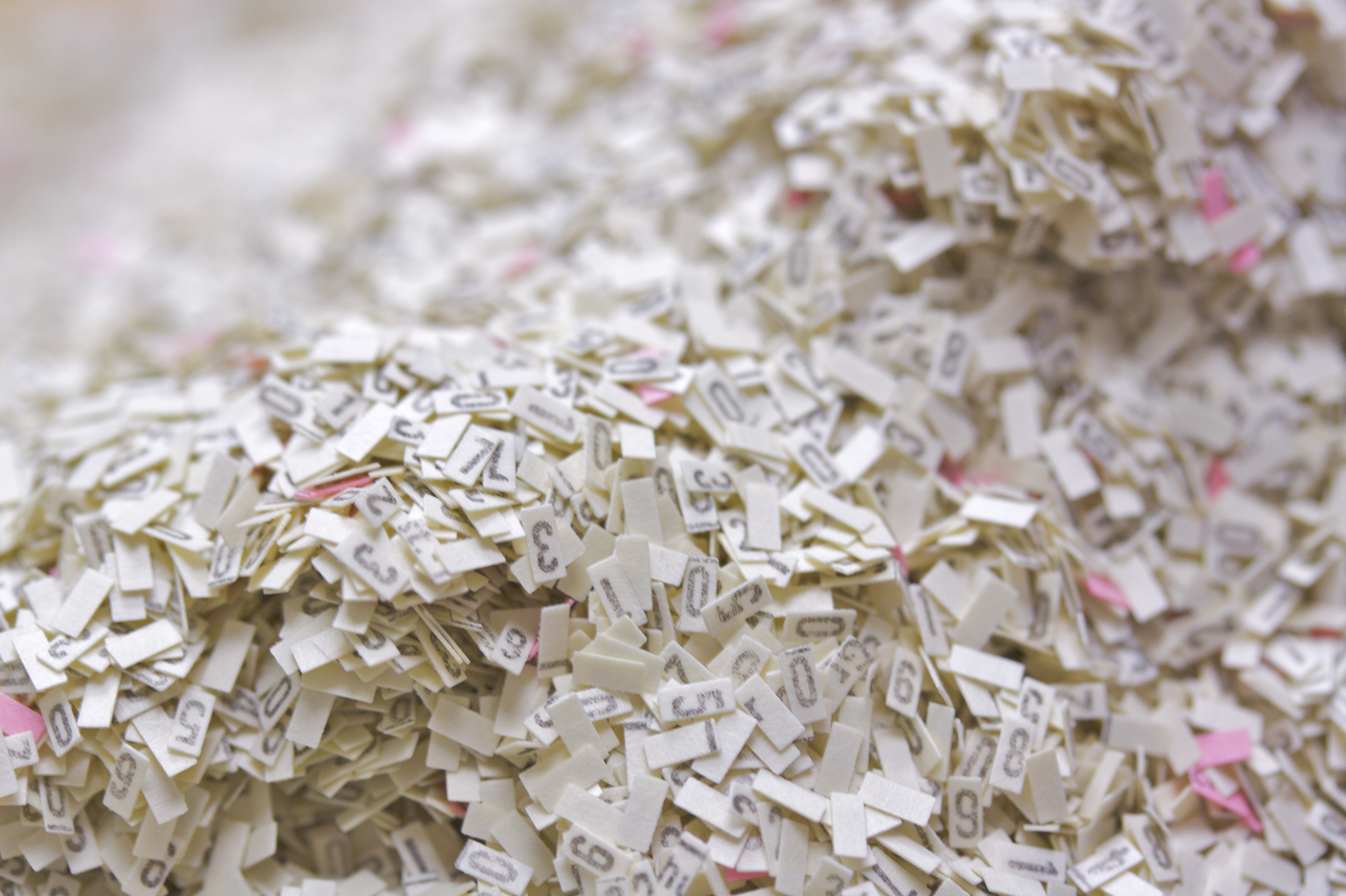
Chads from punched cards. Each chad is about 3 mm (1/8 in) long.

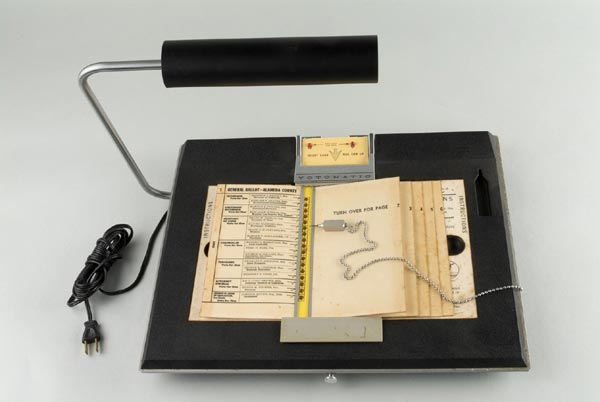
Votomatic voting machines of the type used in the 2000 election in Florida

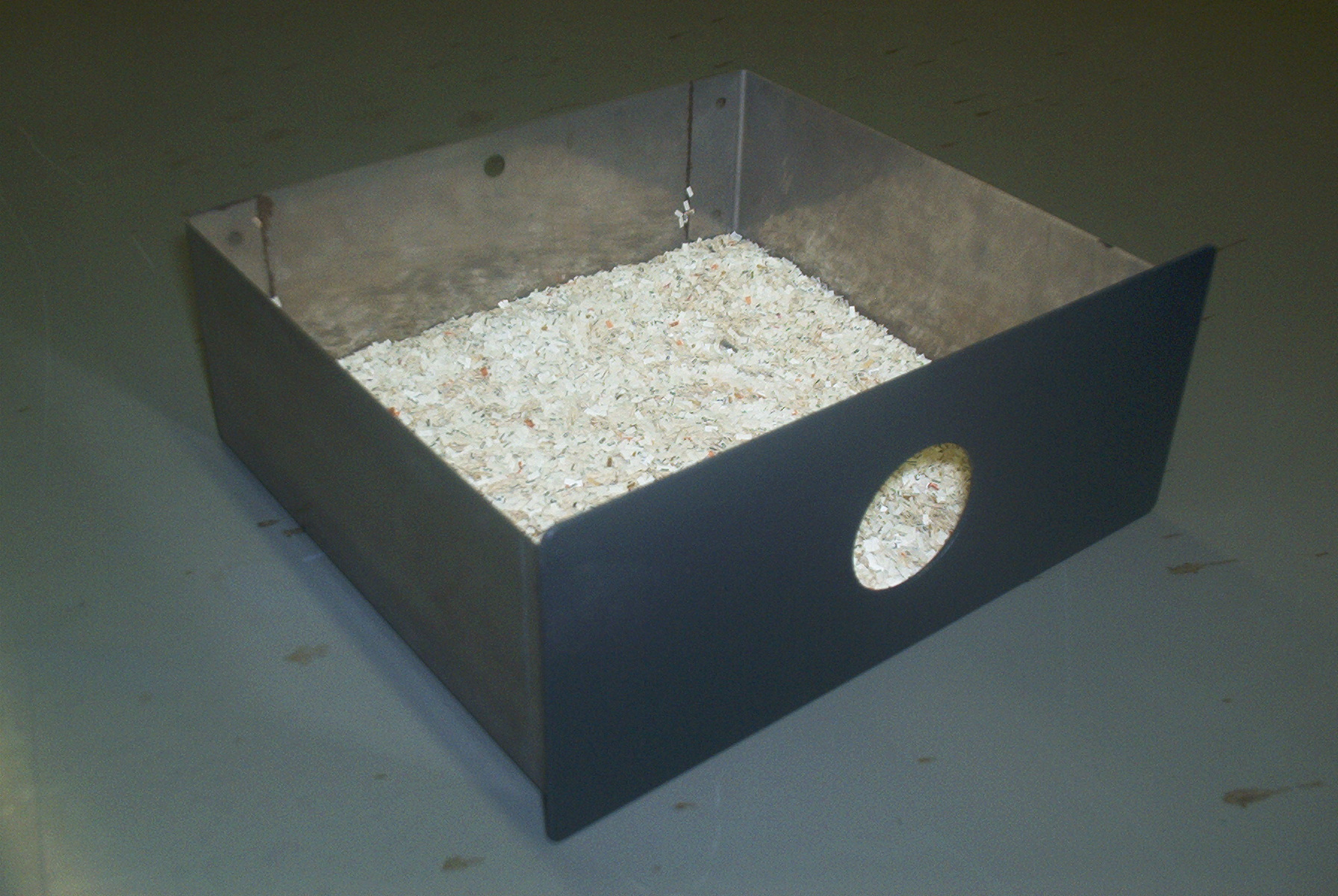
The chip (chad) receiver from a UNIVAC key punch

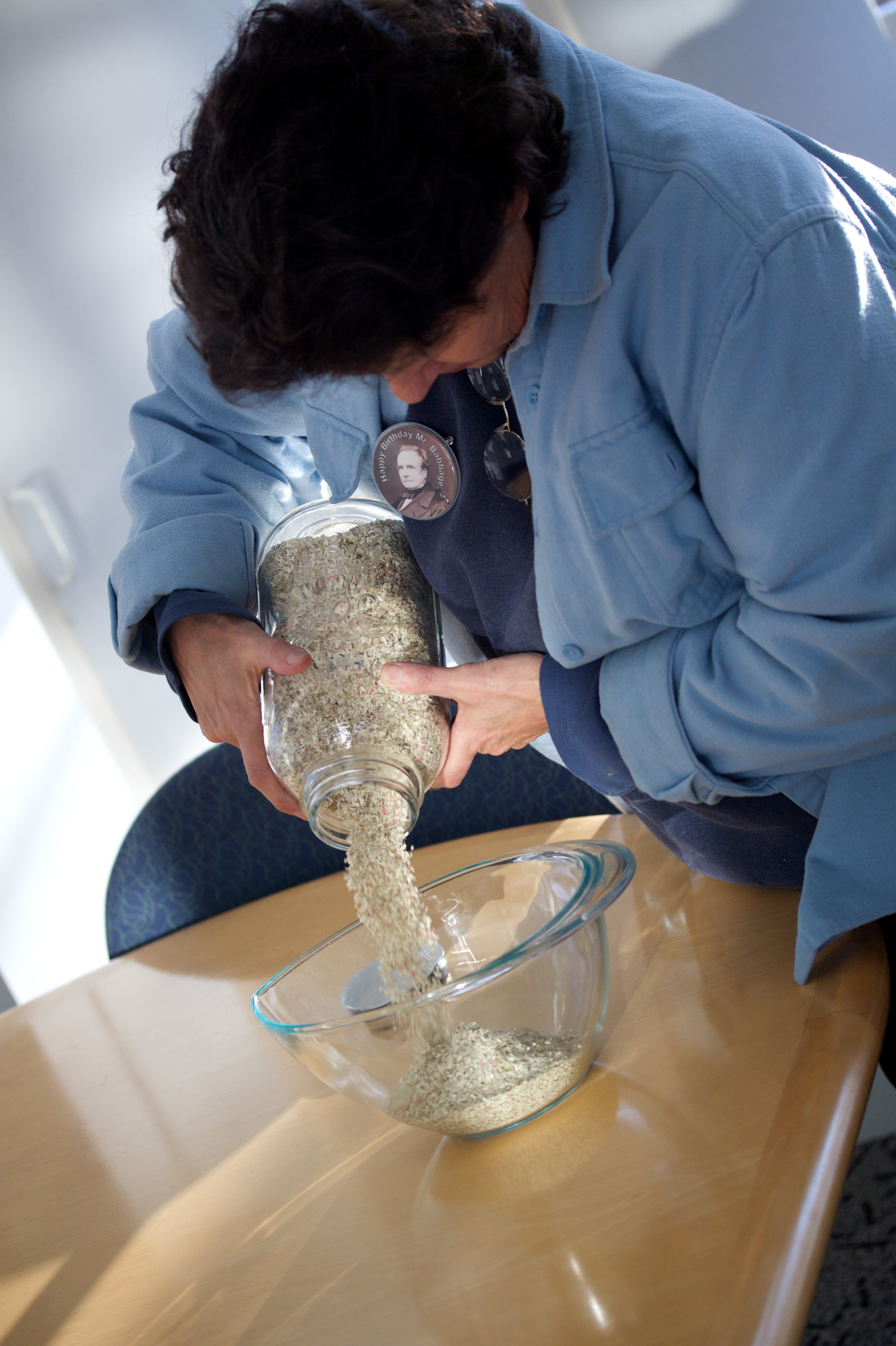
Pouring chads from a jar at the Computer History Museum

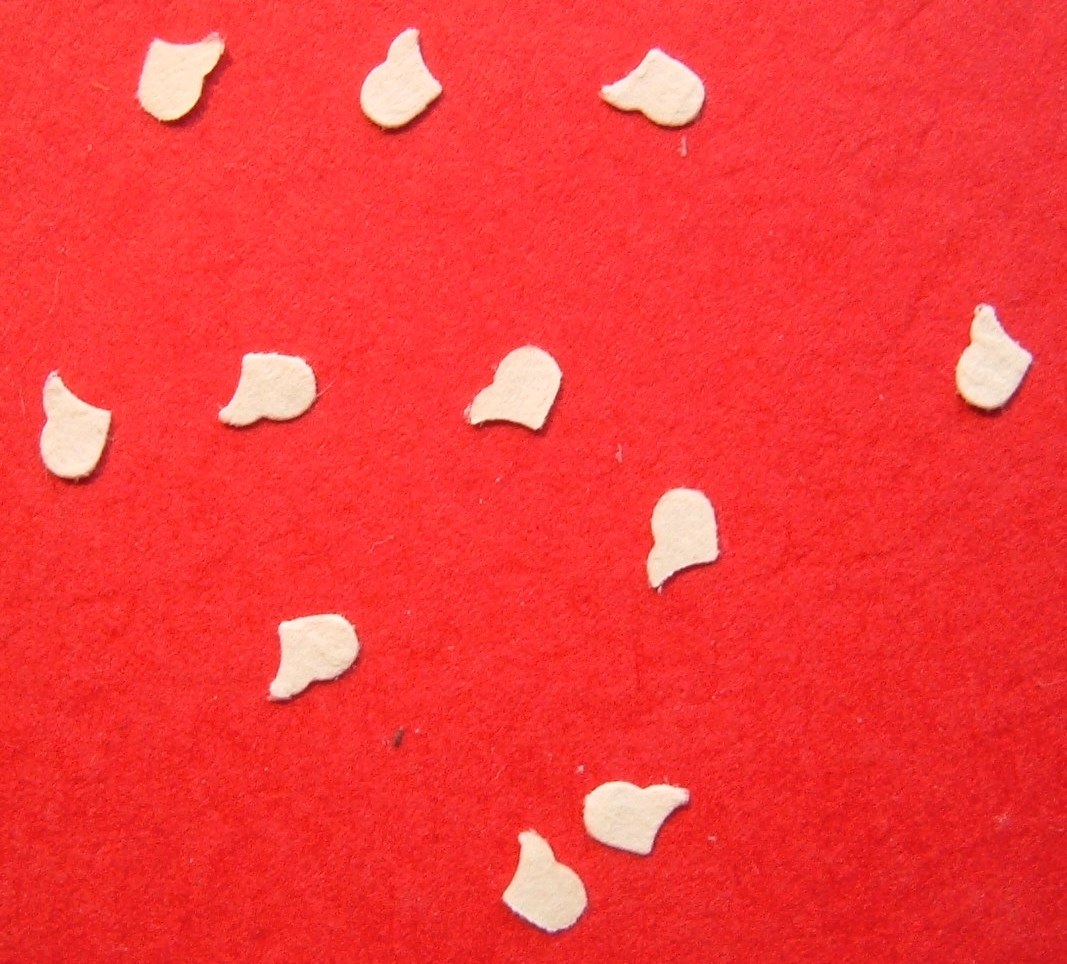
Asymmetrical chad produced by a railroad ticket punch

Chad refers to fragments sometimes created when holes are made in a paper, card or similar synthetic materials, such as computer punched tape or punched cards. The word "chad" has been used both as a mass noun (as in "a pile of chad") and as a countable noun (pluralizing as in "many chads").

== Etymology ==
The origin of the term chad is uncertain. Patent documents from the 1930s and 1940s show the word "chad", often in reference to punched tape used in telegraphy. These patents sometimes include synonyms such as "chaff" and "chips". A patent filing in 1930 included a "receptacle or chad box ... to receive the chips cut from the edge of the tape." A 1938 patent filing included a "chaff or chad chute" to collect the waste fragments. Both patents were assigned to Teletype Corporation.

The plural chads is attested from about 1939, along with chadless, meaning "without [loose] chad". Clear definitions for both terms are offered by Walter Bacon in a patent application filed in 1940 assigned to Bell Telephone Laboratories: "... In making these perforations, the perforator cuts small round pieces of paper, known in the art as chads, out of the tape. These chads are objectionable ... Chadless tape is prepared by feeding blank tape through a device which will not punch a complete circle in the tape but, instead, will only cut approximately three-quarters of the circumference of a circle ... thereby leaving a movable, or hinged, lid of paper in the tape."

In the New Hacker's Dictionary, two unattributed and likely humorous derivations for "chad" are offered, a back-formation from a personal name "Chadless" and an acronym for "Card Hole Aggregate Debris". Other etymologies claim derivation from the Scottish name for river gravel, chad, or the British slang for louse, chat.

== Partially punched chad ==
When a chad is not fully detached, it is described by various terms corresponding to the level of modification from the unpunched state. The distinctions are of importance in counting cards used in voting. The following terms are sometimes used when describing a four-cornered chad:

- Hanging chads are attached to the ballot at only one corner.
- Swinging chads are attached to the ballot at two corners.
- Tri-chads are attached to the ballot at three corners.
- Dimpled chads are attached to the ballot at all four corners, but bear an indentation indicating the voter may have intended to mark the ballot. (Sometimes "pregnant" is used to indicate a greater mark than "dimpled".)

== 2000 United States presidential election controversy ==
In the 2000 United States presidential election in Florida, many of the state's counties used Votomatic-style punched card ballots where incompletely punched holes resulted in partially punched chads: either a "hanging chad", where one or more corners were still attached, or a "fat chad" or "pregnant chad", where all corners were still attached, but an indentation appears to have been made. These votes were not counted by the tabulating machines. The aftermath of the controversy (Bush v. Gore) caused the rapid discontinuance of punch card ballots in the United States.

== See also ==
- Bit bucket
- Chinese paper cutting
- Confetti, recycling chad for celebratory use.
- Keypunch—Card punch
- Papel picado
- Paper tape
- Punched card
- Recount (film)
- Teleprinter—Teletype
