= Paper drilling =

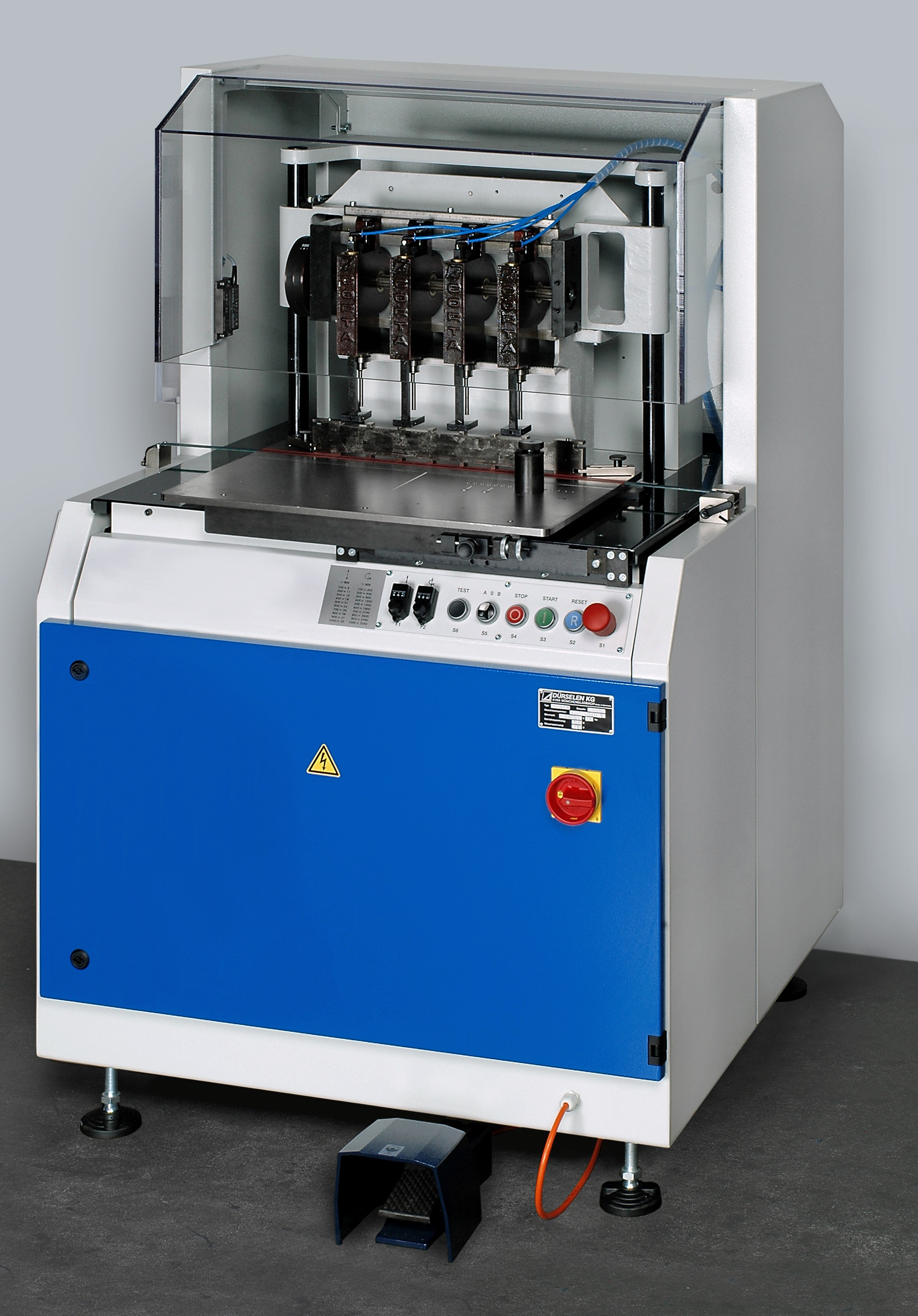
Paper-drilling machine

Paper drilling is a technique used in binderies for providing large quantities of paper with round holes. The paper can be processed as loose leaves and in brochures (stitched, perfectly bound). The holes can be drilled for storage purposes, such as filing, or sometimes for decorative purposes.

== Terminology ==
Paper drilling describes a technology for providing paper with round holes. For this purpose, paper-drilling machines are used. Paper-drilling machines are the generic term for manual, motorized, and fully automated paper drills.

The paper-drilling system is an automated paper-drilling machine that usually integrates several production steps into one continuous workflow. The phrase paper drill is used as well for paper-drilling machines as for the tools used for paper drilling.

== Technology ==
Paper drilling is a method to drill round holes into paper and other materials. For this purpose, hollow paper drill bits are clamped into a driven spindle that drills into the pile of paper. Paper drill bits are available for different hole sizes and in different coating qualities. Unlike hole punching, where only one or a few sheets may be processed, a large number of sheets can be processed with a paper-drilling machine. Depending on the type of paper drill, either the paper drill bits are lowered into the pile or the table is lifted. Paper-drilling machines can be equipped with a different number of spindles, which are each built into one paper drill head. The range starts with one- and two-spindle paper drills for small volumes and office purposes and reaches up to paper-drilling platforms with more than 20 spindles/paper drill heads.

== Applications ==
Applications for paper drilling include file holes for different ring binders, loose leaf collections, rows of holes for wire comb binding, and tags. Many products processed on a paper drilling machine are stationery. Additionally, catalogues, manuals, and brochures are drilled on a paper-drilling system to be able to file them in a binder. Sometimes, drilled holes are used for decorative purposes. In addition to different stock types, such as offset paper, bond paper, glossy paper, and coated paper, a modern paper-drilling machine can drill many other materials like plastic films, cardboard, foils, etc.

Some casinos use a paper drill to deface used decks of playing cards, a process known as canceling. Cards are canceled so that they cannot be marked by cheaters outside of the casino and surreptitiously brought back into play.

They can also be used domestically in place of a standard hole punch, most notably Oliver Lambert of London, who is well known for his extensive passion for their use. In recent years, due to their rarity, they have become sought-after collector's items, often going for considerable prices in second hand markets.

== Users of paper drills ==
Paper-drilling machines are used in trade binderies, commercial print shops with finishing departments, in-house print shops, and domestic and copy shops. Depending on the volumes, these companies operate many different types of paper-drilling machines, from simple one- and two-spindle hand-operated tabletop paper drills to standard motorized four-spindle paper-drilling machines and fully automated, integrated paper-drilling systems. These high-performance paper drills can run in line with other finishing equipment.
