= Leather punch =

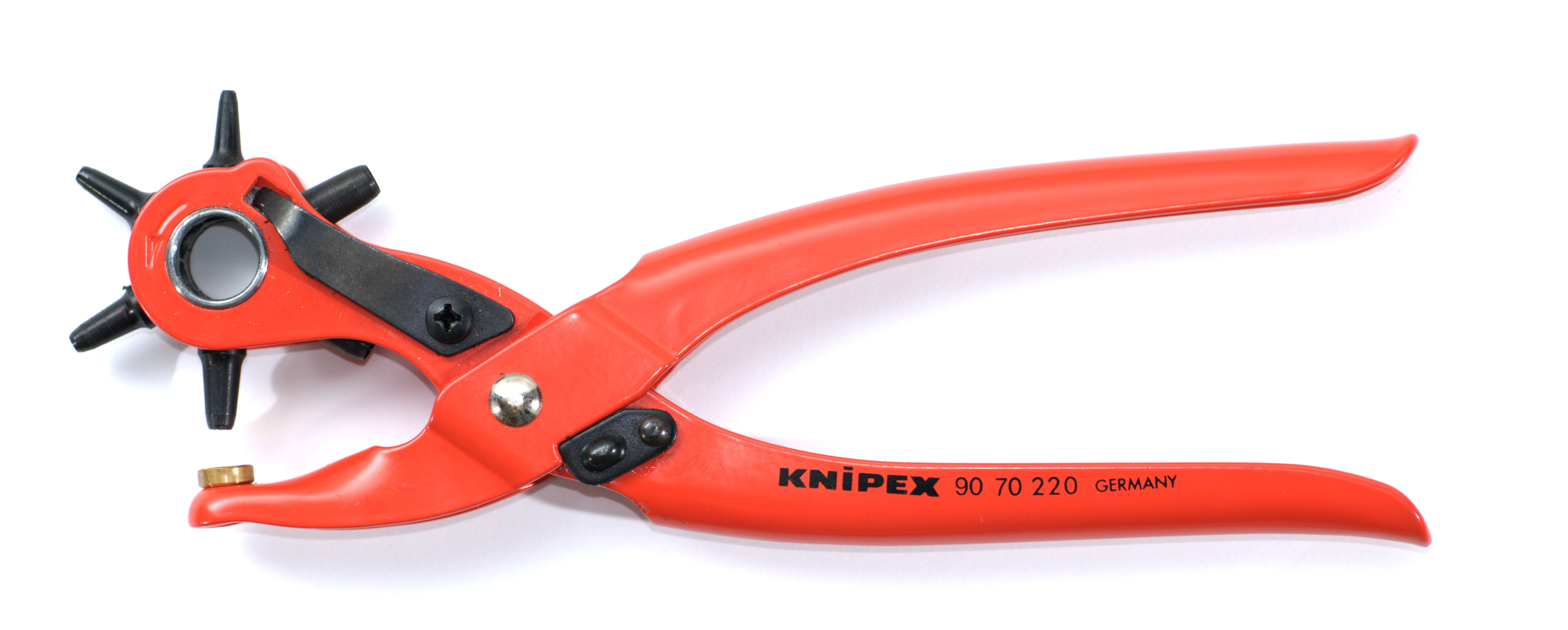
Turret leather punch

A leather punch is a hole punch specifically for making holes in leather. The working tip of the punch is a hollow steel cylinder with a sharp circular knife-like edge. The leather piece is placed on a hard surface, which may be a part of the tool set, and the punch is forced through it, cutting out a small circular piece which is discarded. The punch may be a simple metal tool struck with a hammer; or several such punches may be mounted on a rotary turret on a pliers-like tool with an anvil, with the desired size selected by rotating the turret. Hole diameters typically range from about 1mm to 6mm. They are typically used for making holes for buckles, eyelets, and rivets in shoes, belts, bridles, etc.

== History ==
Common "Turret Pliers" pictured above were first Patented in 1865, by Peter Bauer of Newark, New York, as a Spring Punch, being a means for "punching holes of different sizes into leather, paper, or any other substance or material of a similar nature, and for inserting and heading eyelets"; as described in the patent.

== See also ==
- Stitching awl
- Hole punch
- Leather crafting
- Grommet
