= Book =

Medium consisting of pages of text or images

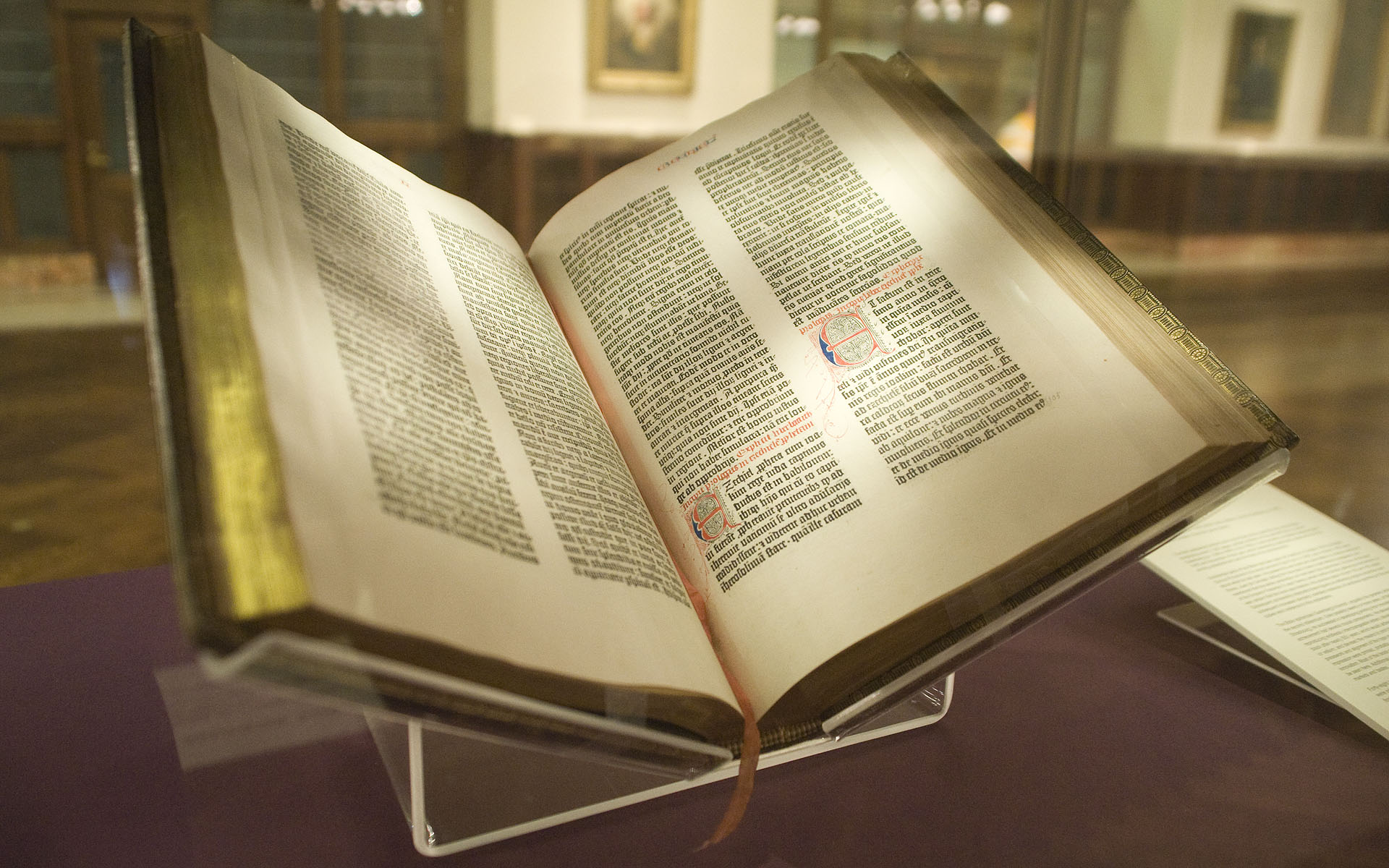
The Gutenberg Bible, published in the mid-15th century, was one of the first books to be printed using the printing press.

A book is a written work of substantial length created by one or more authors. The work is typically printed on many sheets of paper as pages bound together into a bookblock, then glued to the middle of a foldable cover that protects the pages. Before the wide adoption of the modern printing press, codices were used to create handwritten manuscripts. Older writing media include scrolls and clay tablets. Nowadays, books can be distributed in other forms like audiobooks, and electronic books (ebooks). Books are broadly classified into fiction, which contains invented or imaginary narratives; and non-fiction, which contains content intended as factual truth.

The book publishing process is the series of steps involved in its creation and dissemination, often undertaken in modern times by a commercial publishing company. The publishing industry has recently seen major changes due to new technologies, including ebooks and audiobooks (recordings of books read aloud). Awareness of the needs of people with print disabilities has led to a rise in accessible publishing formats such as braille printing and large-print editions. Google Books estimated in 2010 that roughly 130 million total unique books have been published.

Books are sold at general retail stores and specialized bookstores, as well as online, and can be borrowed from libraries or public bookcases. The reception of books has led to several social consequences, including censorship.

Books are sometimes contrasted with periodical literature, such as newspapers or magazines, for which new editions are published according to a regular schedule. Some objects broadly described as "books" are left empty for personal use, such as notebooks, diaries, sketchbooks, account books, and autograph books.

== Etymology ==
The word book comes from the Old English bōc, which is similar to Old Norse bók and Old Saxon bōk. These may all come from hypothesized Germanic *bōks, thought to mean "beech". In Slavic languages like Russian, Bulgarian, and Macedonian буква (bukva)—"letter"—is cognate with "beech". The Russian word букварь (bukvar'), and the Serbian буквар (bukvar) refer to a primary school textbook that helps young children master reading and writing. It is thus conjectured that the earliest Indo-European writings may have been carved on beech wood. The Latin word codex, describing the format used by a modern book, bound and with separate leaves, originally meant "block of wood".

== Definitions ==
A book is traditionally composed of many pages bound together along one edge and protected by a cover, but technological advances have expanded the meaning of the term substantially over time with the evolution of communication media. Book and publishing historian Zoran Velagić wrote that for the book, "consensus does not exist 'even at the level of a basic definition'".

One definition was given by UNESCO in 1964 for recording national statistics on book production: a book is "a non-periodical printed publication of at least 49 pages, exclusive of the cover pages, published in the country and made available to the public". This distinguished books from other written material such as pamphlets. Kovač et al. critiqued the UNESCO definition for not accounting for new formats. They proposed four criteria (length, textual content, a defined form, and "information architecture [such as] linear structure and key textual elements") that different types of books meet to different degrees. In their "hierarchy of the book", formats that fulfill more criteria are more similar to the traditional printed book.

Historian James Raven suggested that when studying how books have been used to communicate, they should be defined in a broadly inclusive way as "portable, durable, replicable and legible" means of recording and disseminating information, rather than relying on physical or contextual features. This would include, for example, ebooks, newspapers, and quipus (a form of knot-based recording historically used by cultures in Andean South America), but not objects fixed in place such as inscribed monuments.

== History ==
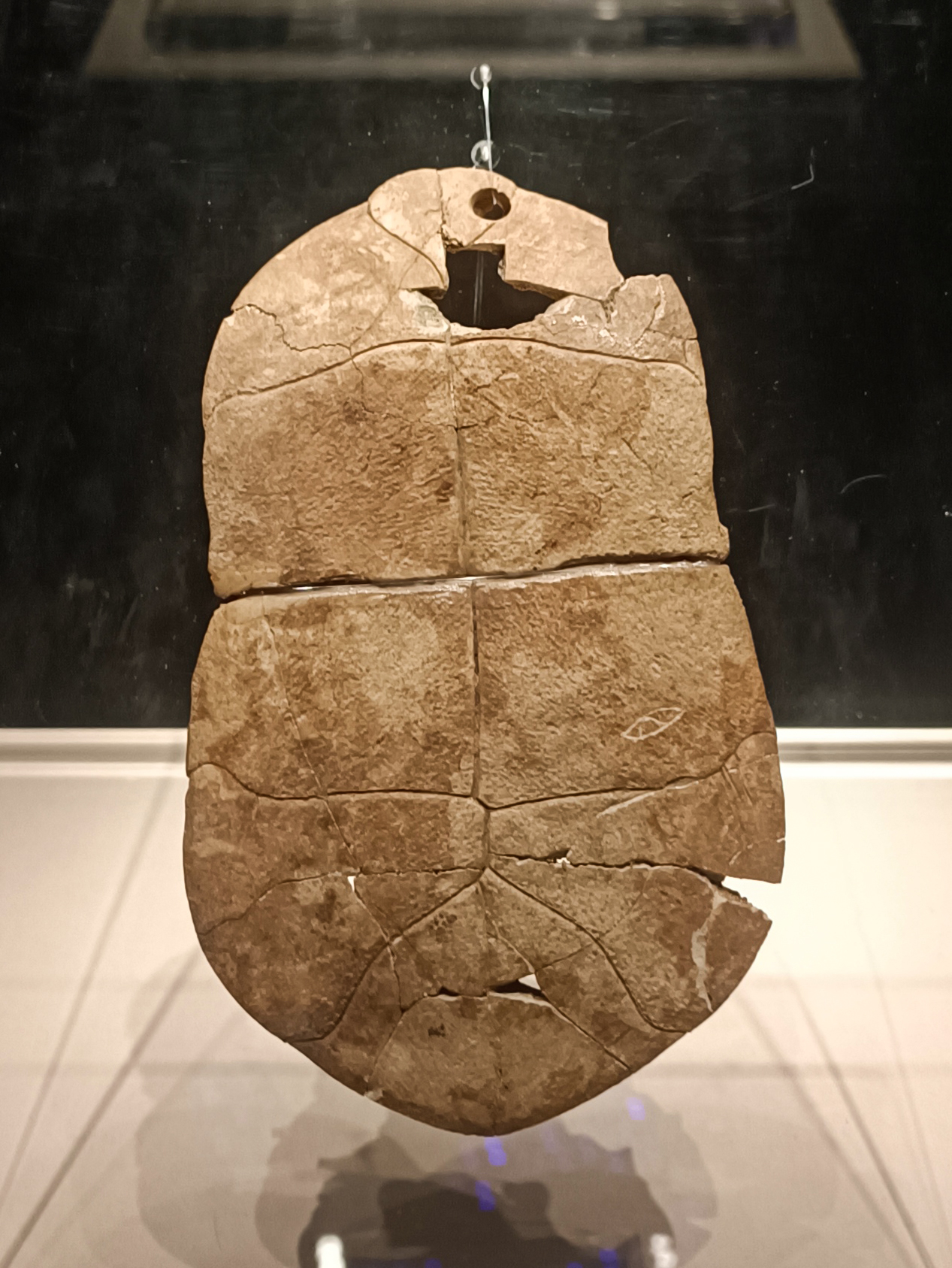
Jiahu symbols written on tortoise shells, such as the eye symbol in the bottom-right, are regarded as a form of proto-writing

The modern book is the product of a long history of gradual development punctuated by several major disruptive innovations. Librarian Fred Kilgour identified the most significant technological changes to the book as: clay tablets, papyrus scrolls, the codex, printing, steam power, offset printing, and electronic books. Many cultures have independently developed pictographic symbols that represent physical things, concepts, and words but lack the capacity to transcribe a spoken language. These systems, often called proto-writing, typically have a narrower or specialized function than a full writing system.

In at least three cases, proto-writing was independently developed into writing systems that can be used to transcribe spoken language: Sumerian cuneiform in Mesopotamia, written Chinese, and the Maya script in pre-Columbian Mesoamerica. For example, the Jiahu symbols found inscribed on bones and tortoise shells in 8,600-year-old Chinese graves are believed by archaeologists to be precursors to the Chinese writing system that only fully emerged thousands of years later. Various forms of pictographs, described by art historian Elizabeth Hill Boone as "non-writing and beyond writing", developed alongside linguistic writing and continue to be used in modern texts, including maps, diagrams, logical notation, mathematical notation, musical notation, and chemistry's structural formulas. Some of the oldest surviving written records were made on clay tablets.

=== Tablet ===
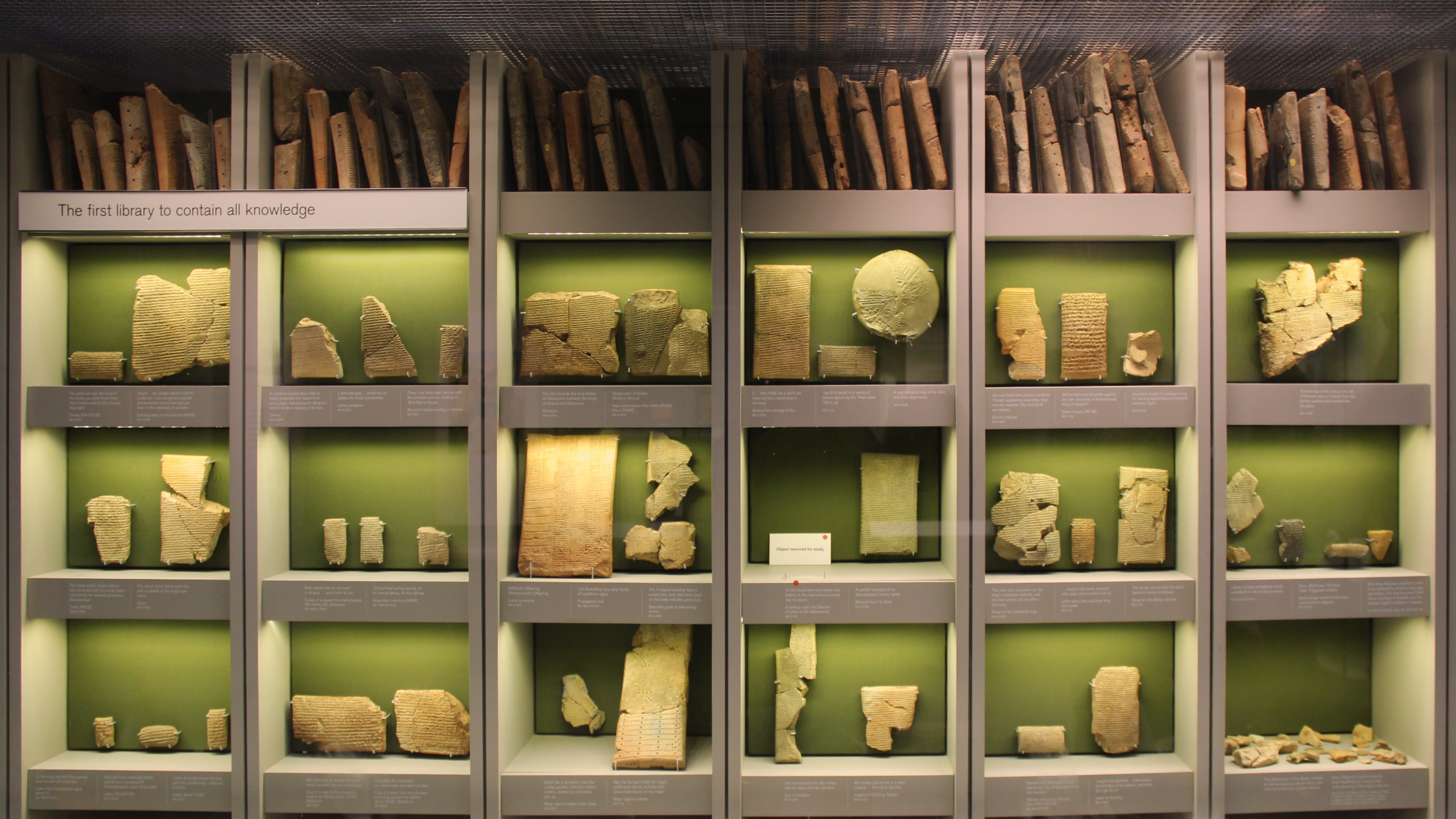
Clay tablets from the library of Ashurbanipal

The earliest surviving texts widely accepted as writing are cuneiform tablets. They emerged from earlier traditions of sealed clay envelopes called bullae, which contained physical tokens, and logographic proto-cuneiform written to represent the physical tokens. Created circa 3200 BC during the Uruk period in modern-day Iraq, the tablets were made from flattened pieces of clay that scribes impressed with a stylus. The clay tablets were used in the Ancient Near East for thousands of years throughout the Bronze Age and well into the Iron Age. Clay tablets are very durable compared to other early writing materials and many survive to the present day. Stored in libraries and private residences, they were used in many of the ways that modern writing is used, including to record literature. The Standard Babylonian version of the Epic of Gilgamesh, one of the oldest surviving works of literature, was written on a series of about 12 tablets each with over 300 lines of cuneiform verse, as a standardized edition of earlier stories copied and compiled by centuries of scribes. Depending on the definition of "book", the tablets are considered either a very early form of the book or a precursor to true books.

=== Scroll ===
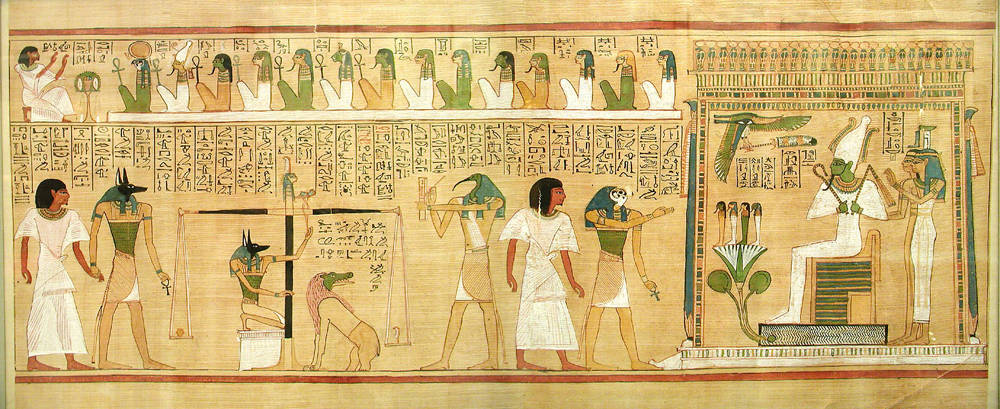
Book of the Dead of Hunefer; c. 1275 BC; ink and pigments on papyrus; 45 × 90.5 cm; British Museum (London)

In Ancient Egypt, a formal writing system known as hieroglyphs developed in parallel to Mesopotamian cuneiform. Ancient Egyptian scribes wrote hieroglyphic texts on papyrus rolled into scrolls, with the oldest surviving (unused) roll of papyrus found preserved in the 2900 BC tomb of Hemaka. The scribes wrote in contrasting black and red ink, with the red used to highlight elements like titles, section headings, and authorship. This practice, called rubrication, was used for millennia in manuscript book production. (Note: The oldest surviving papyrus with hieroglyphic writing is the Diary of Merer, a logbook recording the transport of stone used to build the Great Pyramid of Giza.) Early scroll books, like The Maxims of Ptahhotep written circa 2400 BC, were philosophical books in the Egyptian sebayt or "teaching" genre.

Hebrew, Greek, and Roman scribes adopted the format, often with a central handle around which the papyrus was rolled. Parchment was not frequently used in scrolls as it increased a manuscript's weight. The codex dominated in the Roman world by Late Antiquity, but scrolls persisted into the early era of printed books in Asia.

=== Codex ===
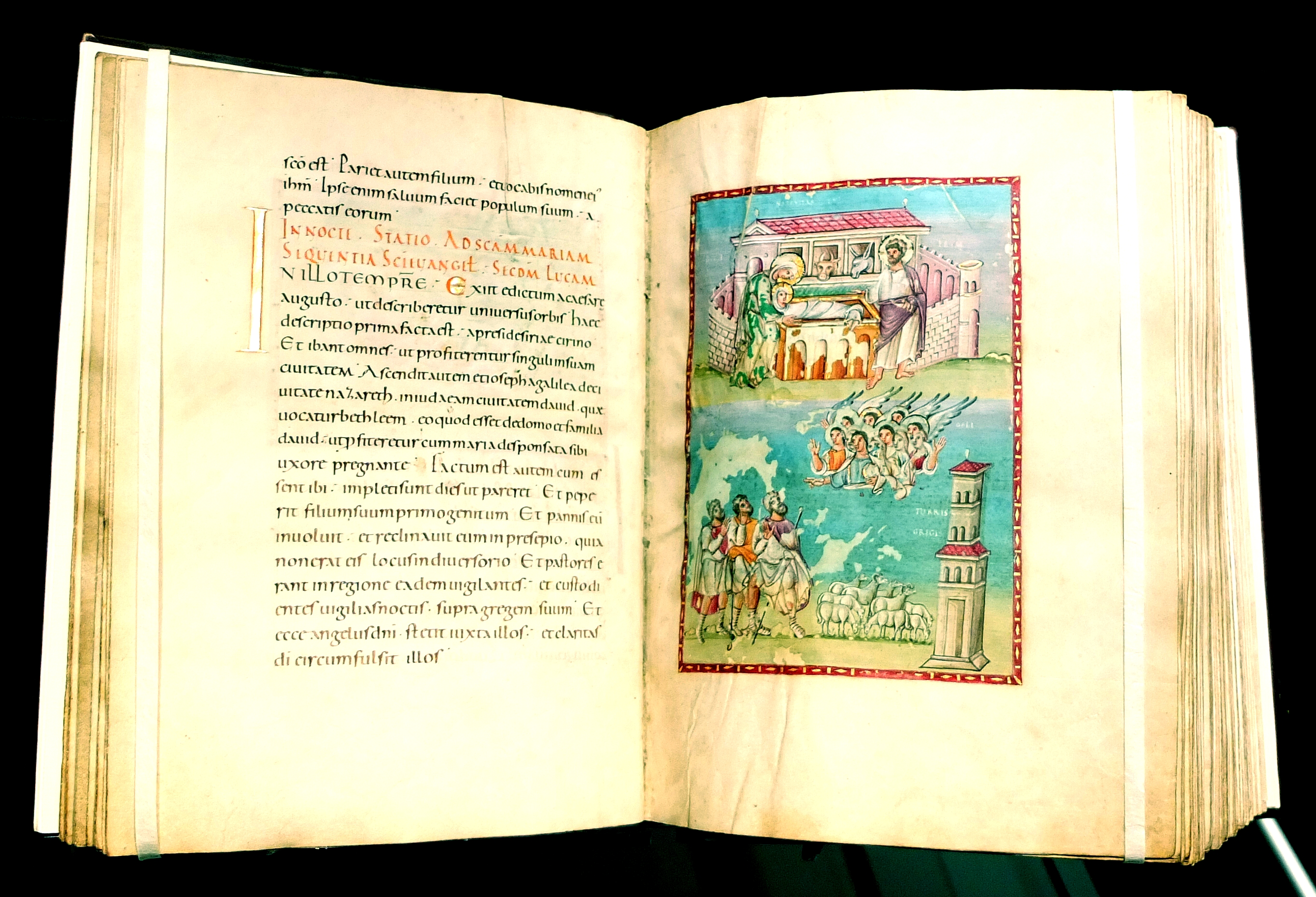
Tenth-century Codex Egberti

The codex is the ancestor of the modern book. It introduced the format where sheets of uniform size were bound along one edge, and typically held between two covers made of some more robust material. Unlike modern books, the early codices were hand-written manuscripts, and the pages were not made from paper, but typically parchment or vellum, derived from animal hides. The first written mention of the codex as a form of book is from Martial, in his Apophoreta CLXXXIV at the end of the first century AD, where he praises its compactness. The codex format was possibly developed from the Roman custom of binding wax tablets (wooden boards containing wax for writing temporary notes with a stylus) together.

The codex format gradually displaced the scroll. The vast majority of surviving Christian texts from before the 5th century AD (158 of 172 documents as of 2002) are codices. Pagan authors were slower to transition, but nearly all Greek texts were being composed as codices rather than scrolls by the end of the 4th century AD. In Islam, many of the earliest manuscript copies of the Quran were composed as codices. Jewish authors were slower to adopt the new format—the oldest surviving Jewish codices date to the 10th century AD—resulting in the scroll becoming a visual shorthand for Jewish culture. To the present day, Torah scrolls are still read aloud in synagogues during Jewish prayers.

Scribes independently developed a similar codex format in pre-Columbian Mesoamerica. They wrote manuscripts onto long folded strips of either fig bark (amatl) or plant fibers and bound them between wooden planks, although only a few have survived. Pictographic writing was widespread, and the Maya developed a phonetic syllabary. The oldest of the surviving Maya codices dates to the 11th century AD. Most of the pre-Columbian Aztec codices were destroyed by the Spanish, but a few, such as the Codex Borbonicus, date to around the time of European arrival.

=== Manuscript ===
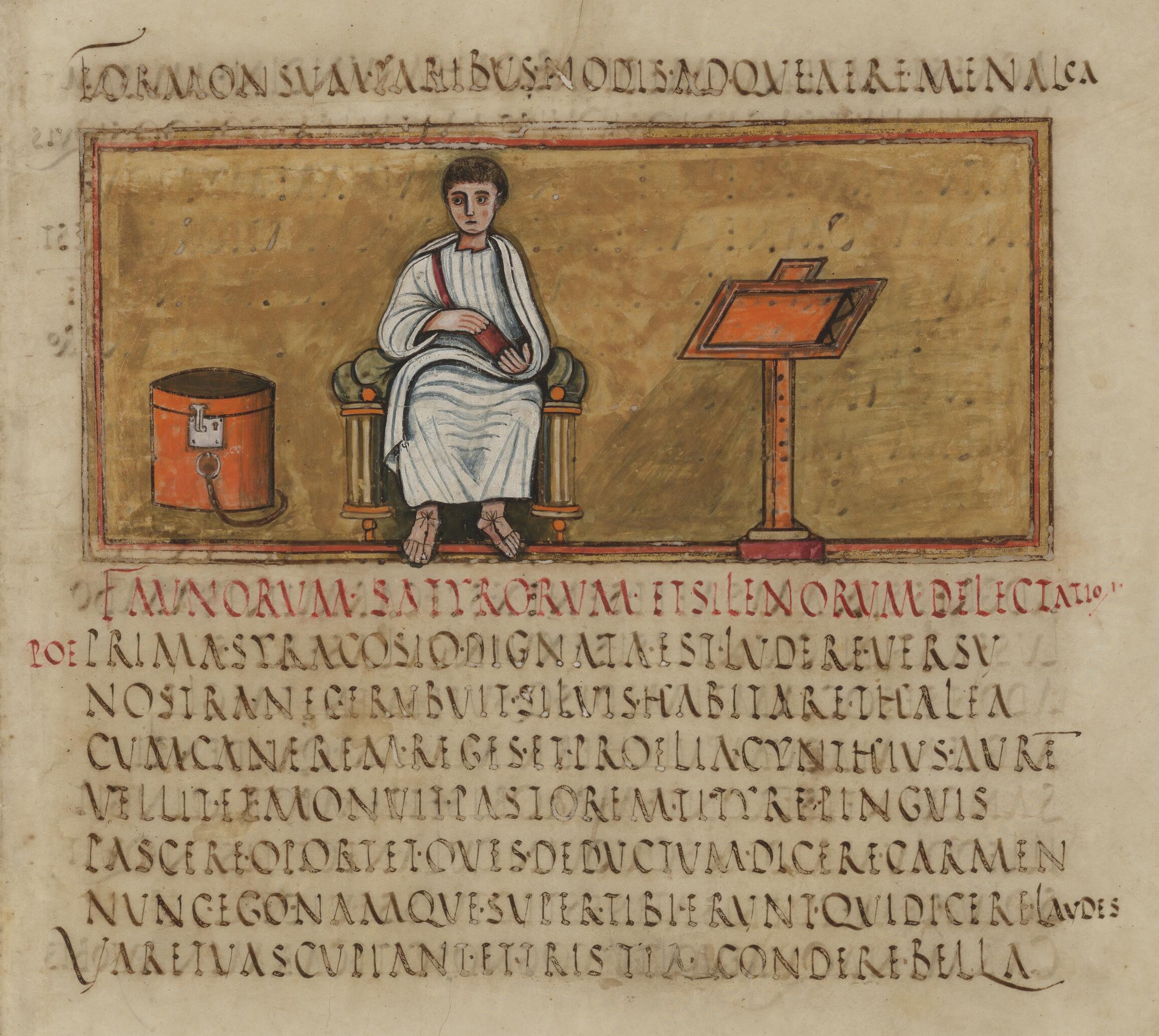
Folio 14 recto of the 5th-century Vergilius Romanus contains an author portrait of Virgil. Note the bookcase (capsa), reading stand, and the text written without word spacing in rustic capitals.

Manuscripts, handwritten and hand-copied documents, were the dominant form of writing before the invention and widespread adoption of print. Before the invention of the printing press in the 15th century, each text was a unique, handcrafted, valuable article, personalized through the design features incorporated by the scribe, owner, bookbinder, and illustrator.

In the early Western Roman Empire, monasteries continued Latin writing traditions, and the clergy were the predominant readers and copyists. The bookmaking process was long and laborious. Before a scribe could copy the text, the pages had to be prepared, planned, and ruled, with spaces left for illustration and rubrication, after which the pages still had to be bound. Manuscript books were expensive and rare. Even at the end of the Middle Ages, the large Paris library of the Sorbonne held only around 2,000 volumes. The rise of universities in the 13th century led to an increased demand for books, and a faster system appeared in which unbound leaves, called pecia, were lent to different copyists.

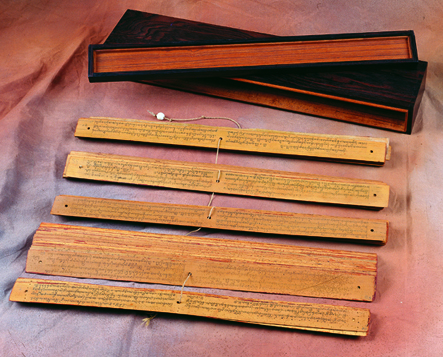
Palm leaf manuscript

In South, Southeast, and Central Asia, bound palm leaf manuscripts have existed for thousands of years. In the 5th century BC, Indian scribes began to use the technique to record what had previously been oral history. Palm leaf manuscripts then spread to neighboring areas, including modern-day Myanmar, Thailand, Malaysia, Indonesia, Sri Lanka, and Tibet. Text was etched into the leaves with a sharp metal stylus. These faint markings would then be brushed with ink, or the whole surface of the leaves would be coated with a mixture of oil and either lamp black or powdered coal. The smooth surface of the leaves could be wiped clean with muslin, leaving the coloring in the incised grooves. Each sheet typically had a hole through which a string could pass, binding the sheets to each other and to hard wooden covers. The bundles were often stored wrapped in cotton cloth to protect them from insects, dust, and dirt. These manuscripts were copied until the widespread usage of paper in the 19th century. Recently, scholars and museums have used a variety of methods to digitally copy surviving manuscripts and physically preserve them.

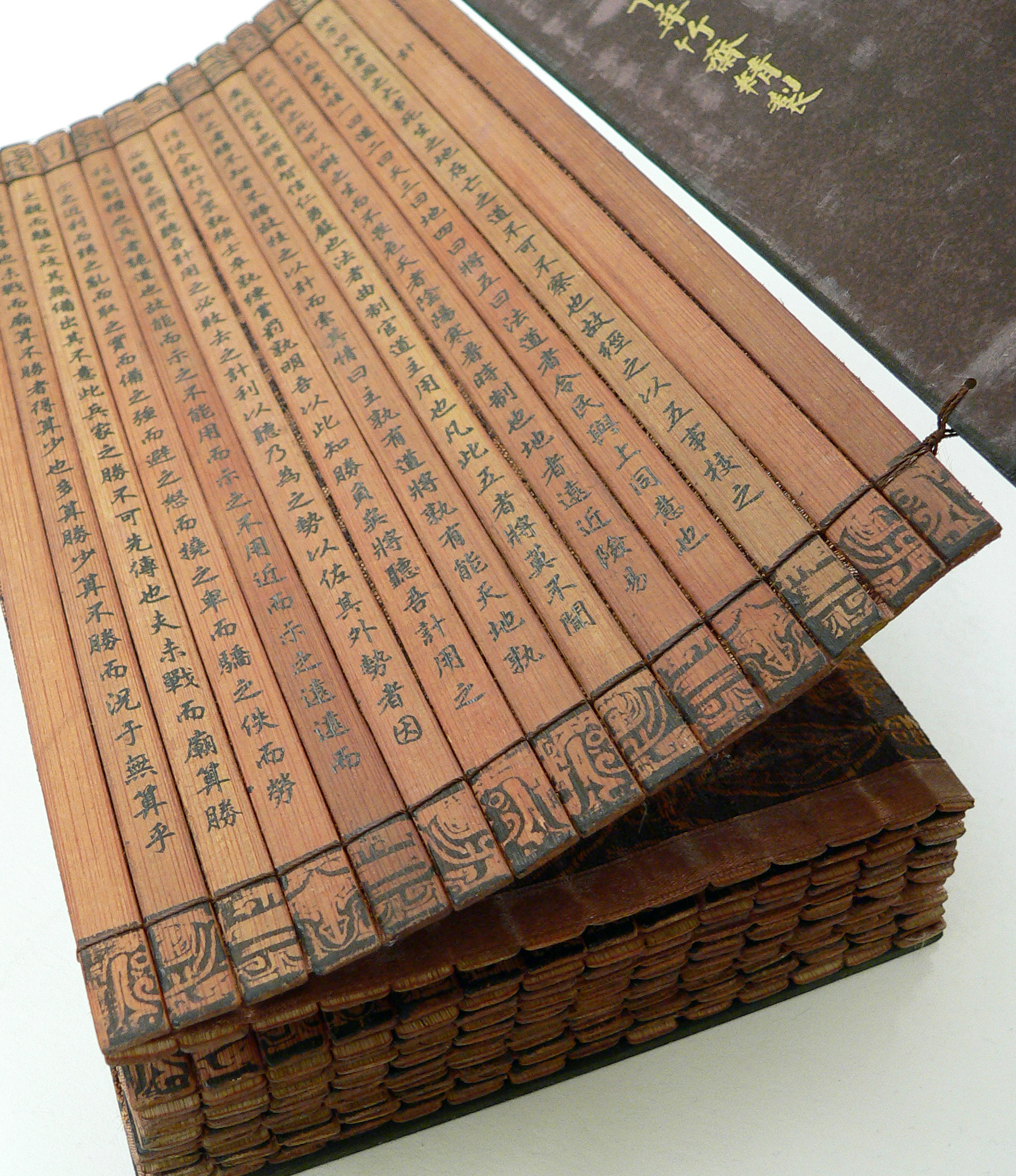
A Chinese bamboo book, The Art of War

Early Chinese manuscript books were made from thin lines of bamboo, each connected to the adjacent strips in long rolls, similar to a papyrus scroll. In older books, characters were inked with a stylus, and in later ones, brushed onto the surface. These bamboo books varied from eight inches to several feet in length.

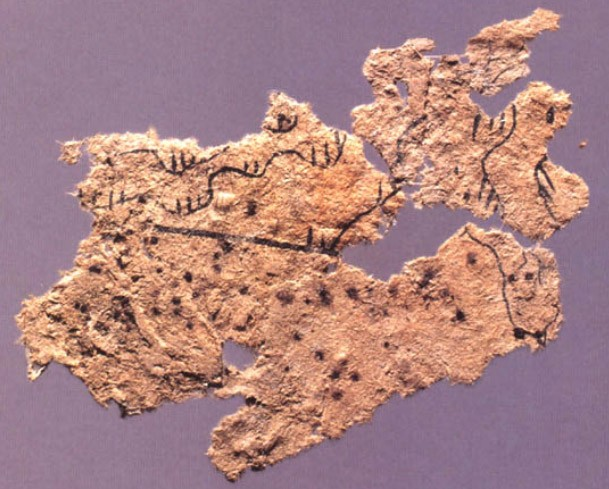
Paper fragment from 200 BC

Paper as a medium developed gradually over centuries within guild and family production, often made during the winters after crops were harvested. Although much of the earliest paper has not survived, a prayer recorded on a slip of paper was found in an adobe home in Xi'an, China, dating to 200 BC. Paper of similar age has been found along the Silk Road trade route extending westward out of China, and historical accounts describe the use of tissue paper. Paper's invention has been traditionally ascribed to Chinese court official Cai Lun, who made a report to the emperor on improved writing paper made from bark, hemp, and recycled materials in 105 AD. Variant forms of papermaking were adopted by Korean and Japanese bookmakers as hanji and washi respectively.

As papermaking spread into the Middle East, its ingredients changed from hemp, bamboo, rice straw, and mainly mulberry bark to linen rags, often recycled in water-powered paper mills. The development of cheap, light, and easy-to-carry Arab paper resulted in the standardization of the Arabic script, rising literacy rates, and the transition of many places from oral to written history. In Egypt, the average cost of a book dropped from 2.80 dinars in the eleventh century to 0.52 in the thirteenth. For an unskilled laborer, this would be a drop from forty-one days' wages down to just eight. Throughout Africa, the book history of many areas began with the introduction of the Ajami scripts based on the Arabic alphabet but used to record native spoken languages. Manuscripts were produced and copied well into the 19th century, when printing presses were brought to many areas of the continent by European missionaries.

=== Woodblock printing ===
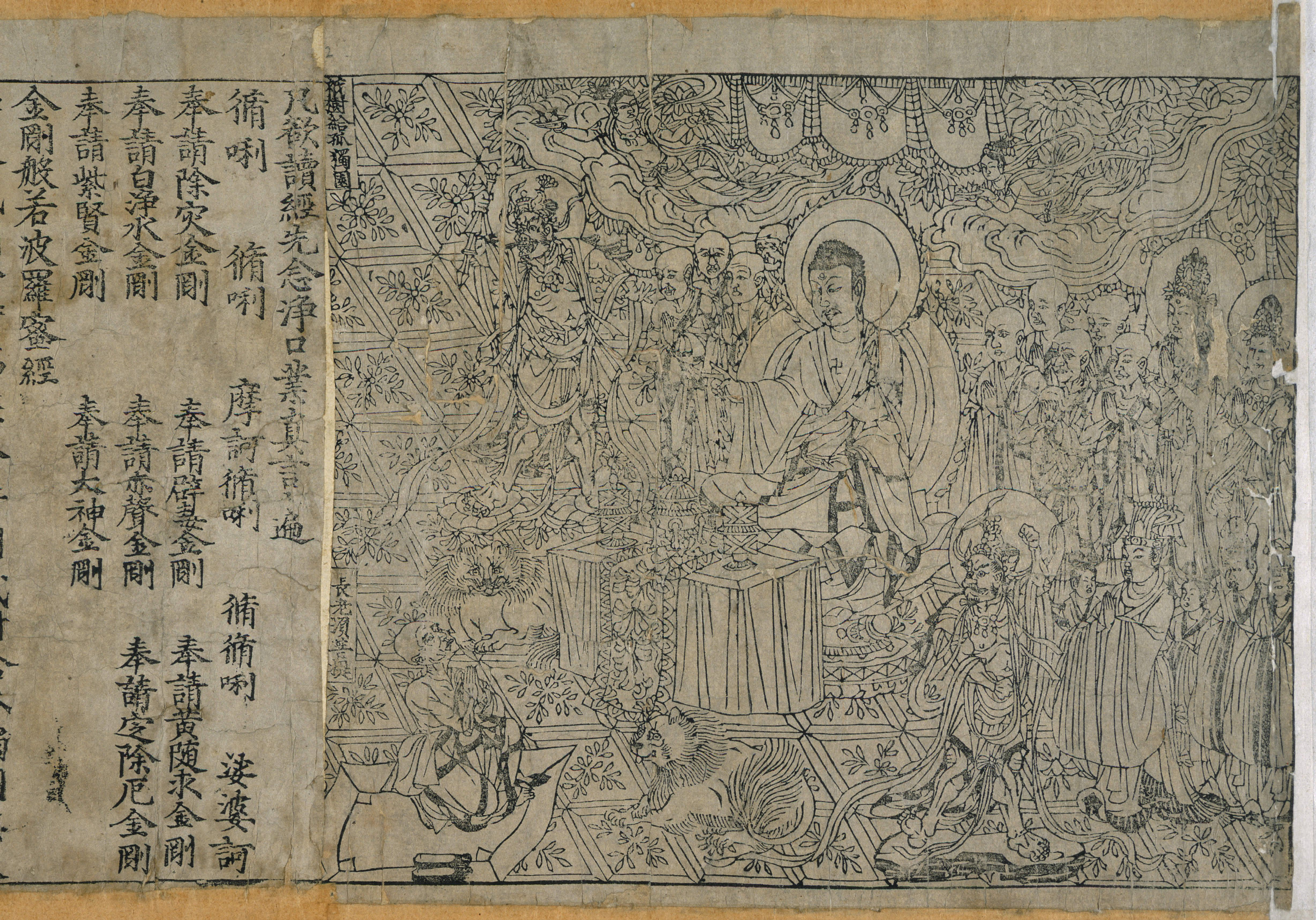
The intricate frontispiece of the Diamond Sutra from Tang dynasty China, 868 AD, the oldest known dated printed book in the world (British Library)

In woodblock printing (called woodcut when used in art), a relief image of an entire page is carved into blocks of wood, inked, and used to print copies of that page. The process gradually evolved from using inked stone seals to stamp textiles. It was popularized by Buddhists in Han China and nearby lands. The practice of hand-copying Buddhist prayers transitioned to printing them from carved blocks, and print runs were done into the tens of thousands during the eighth century. The oldest surviving printed book is an 11-page Korean scroll from around 700 AD. The oldest printed book with a publication date is The Diamond Sutra, "printed on May 11, 868, by Wang Jie".

In Europe, the demand for manuscripts began to grow in the 13th century, and block printing appeared in the early 14th century, seemingly as an independent development. Codex-format books were produced by this method, known as block-books. Their creation remained a time-consuming process; a page or illustration was drawn, which was then typically hand carved by a formschneider, or wood-block carving specialist. The blocks could also crack from age or deform with use. After the introduction of movable type, block books continued to be produced and woodcut illustrations were included in pages of movable type, as the early processes inked the type in a similar way to block printing.

=== Movable type ===
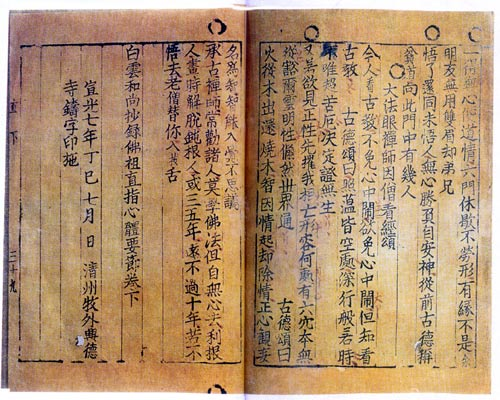
Selected Teachings of Buddhist Sages and Son Masters, the earliest known book printed with movable metal type, printed in Korea, in 1377, Bibliothèque nationale de France

The Chinese inventor Bi Sheng made movable type of earthenware c. 1045, but the fragile clay type was never used for mass production. Wooden movable type was used instead. The Western Xia dynasty printed the Auspicious Tantra of All-Reaching Union, a 449-page text considered to be the earliest extant example of a text printed using the wooden movable type. in the 12th century. Metal movable type was used in China by the 12th century for anti-counterfeit markers on paper money or official documents. After massive fires reduced the available wood in Korea, metal type was invented in the thirteenth century and used alongside woodblock printing. In 1234, cast metal movable type was used in Goryeo (Korea) to print the 50-volume Prescribed Texts for Rites of the Past and Present, compiled by Ch'oe Yun-ŭi, but no copies survived to the present. Jikji, printed in Korea in 1377, is believed to be the world's oldest metallic movable type-printed book. During the Mongol Empire (1206–1405), printing using movable type spread to the Uyghurs of Central Asia. They used movable type for their script with some Chinese words printed between the pages which suggests that the books were printed in China.

Around 1450, Johannes Gutenberg independently invented movable type in Europe, along with innovations in casting the type based on a matrix and hand mould. Movable type made books quicker and less expensive to produce, and therefore more widely available. The earliest printed books created before 1501 in Europe are known as incunables or incunabula.

Steam-powered presses further accelerated manufacturing processes and contributed to increased literacy rates. Steam-powered printing presses could print 1,100 sheets per hour and became popular in the early 19th century. Copyright protection also emerged, securing authors' rights and shaping the publishing landscape. In the late 19th century, two types of machines were invented to cast molten metal into type blocks as an operator pressed keys on a keyboard: Monotype, which cast a single letter similar to movable type, was used heavily in book publishing, and linotype, which cast an entire "line of type" in one block, was adopted more by newspapers.

=== Modern publishing technologies ===
Offset printing of individual pages

The 20th century witnessed the advent of typewriters, computers, and desktop publishing, transforming document creation and printing. Offset printing largely replaced movable type, and mass market books are still typically printed this way. Offset printing, a form of lithography, allows for faster printing, color printing, and a broader range of layouts that can easily include photographs and illustrations. In offset printing, an image is transferred onto a metal plate, which is mounted on a rotating plate cylinder. Water rollers fill the negative space on the plate, ink rollers ink the image, and the ink is offset onto a rubber blanket on another roller that transfers it to the paper. Because oil and water are immiscible—they repel each other rather than mix—the ink is kept out of the negative space. Unlike the older letterpress printing, the paper does not have to press into the roller and can move through the machine much faster. In 1954, publisher Staley T. McBrayer invented web offset printing, where paper is fed in as a continuous web that is machine-cut into separate pages. By the 1970s, offset printing largely replaced letterpress, and many former letterpress operators retrained as offset printers.

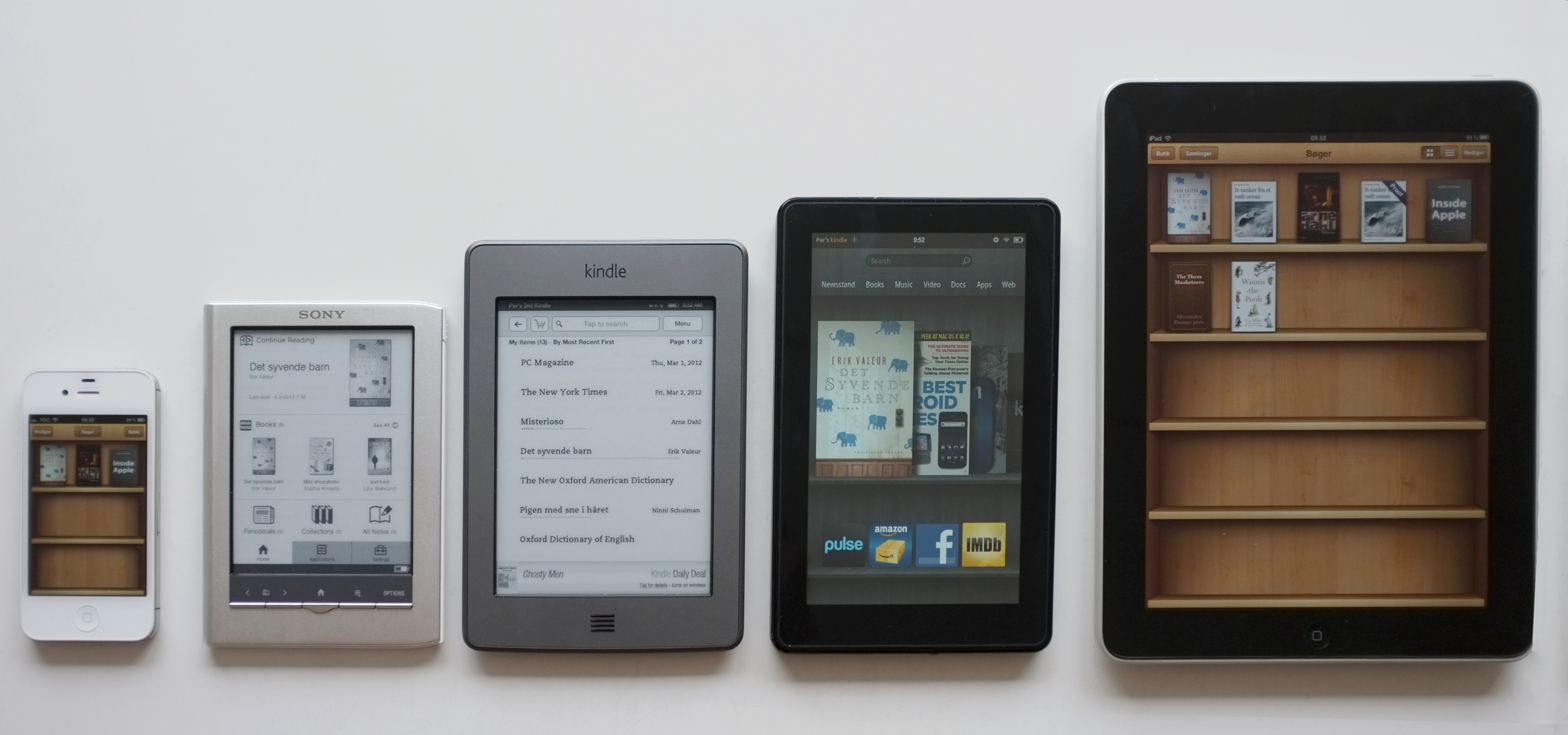
Ebooks on a range of devices

Digital advancements in the 21st century led to the rise of new formats alongside traditional paper books. Four technologies have increasingly shaped book publishing and reading habits: ebooks, digital distribution over the internet, audiobooks, and print-on-demand. Print on demand (POD) machines print from digital files directly onto paper, similar to how office printers operate. POD makes it possible to print as few as one book at a time, enables more affordable self-publishing, and has allowed low-selling titles to remain in print.

Increasing numbers of books are published and distributed digitally. When readership of ebooks spiked during the COVID-19 pandemic, Amazon became a primary distribution channel for many publishers, who also removed restrictions on library purchases. Library ebook platform OverDrive said that 662 million e-books, audiobooks, and digital magazines were borrowed in 2023. Audiobooks, spoken recordings of books, have become increasingly popular as the means for listening to them has become more convenient from early phonograph recordings through cassette tapes, dedicated MP3 players, and smartphone applications. Additionally, several modern techniques make literature more inclusive, including screen readers, large print, and braille for the visually impaired.

In a 2021 survey of American adults' reading habits in the past year, 65% reported reading a printed book, 30% reported reading at least one e-book in the previous year, and 23% reported listening to an audiobook. Digital distribution and print-on-demand decrease the waste of mass printing, where books need to be printed and stored in advance.

== Formats and media ==
=== Hardback and paperback ===
A hardcover book is bound with rigid protective covers (typically of binder's board or heavy paperboard covered with buckram or other cloth, heavy paper, or occasionally leather). It has a flexible, sewn spine which allows the book to lie flat on a surface when opened. Modern hardcovers may have the pages glued onto the spine in much the same way as paperbacks.

Paperback books long existed as a cheaper alternative to hardcover printing, but became a major part of reading culture when publishers like Penguin and Pocket Books printed mass-market paperbacks to be distributed in new outlets like pharmacies and newsstands. Publishers have historically released paperbacks as low-cost editions of major books and for titles with lower expected sales. From 2019 to 2024, sales of mass-market paperbacks dropped sharply.

Paperback books typically have a cover made from one sheet of thick paper or paperboard, also known as a wrapper, that is folded into the front cover, spine, and back cover of the book. In the most common method, perfect binding, the pages are glued together and glued against the spine of the wrapper rather than being bound with stitching. Shorter paperbacks are sometimes saddle stitched, a method where staples are driven through the center of each folio and the wrapper to produce a spineless book. Another method for binding longer paperback books is mechanical binding method, including comb binding and wire binding. In these methods, a plastic or metal device is passed through holes in the book block. Mechanically bound books can lay open on flat surfaces.

=== Ebooks ===
A PDF ebook of Moby Dick by Herman Melville

Several ebook concepts were published before they were technologically feasible to implement, including futurist Bob Brown's "Readies" (1929), inventor Vannevar Bush's Memex (1945), educator Ángela Ruiz Robles's Enciclopedia Mecanica (1948), and computer scientist Alan Kay's Dynabook (1968). The first widely accepted ebook was in 1971 when Michael Hart started Project Gutenberg to distribute public domain literature by manually retyping the Declaration of Independence. Shortly before the internet opened for public commerce in 1994, BiblioBytes launched the first online platform to sell and distribute ebooks. In 2000, author Stephen King partnered with the online booksellers Barnes & Noble and Amazon.com to distribute his novel Riding the Bullet exclusively as an ebook, which was downloaded over 400,000 times in the first 24 hours.

An ebook (short for electronic book), also spelled e-book or eBook, is a book publication made available in electronic form, consisting of text, images, or both. They can be read on the flat-panel display of computers or other electronic devices. Although sometimes defined as "an electronic version of a printed book", some digital-only and digital-first ebooks exist with no printed equivalent. Ebooks can be read on dedicated e-reader devices and on any computer device that features a controllable viewing screen, including desktop computers, laptops, tablets and smartphones.

Digital media has greatly diminished some analog formats like the newspaper, but ebooks and physical books continue to sell alongside each other. Most countries still publish more physical books than ebooks. in 2022 In the United States, ebook annual revenue was $2.1 billion in 2024. This was about 6.5% of the total book sales for the year, and a 78.1% increase from five years prior. Readership of ebooks surpassed paper books by 2016 in China. This is driven partly by super apps, like WeChat, that combine social media, video, shopping, and e-reader functions into a single application that can offer low cost and even free books.

=== Audiobooks ===
Audiobook of Helen Keller's autobiography, first chapter

An audiobook or talking book is a recording of a book or other work being read aloud. A reading of a complete book is described as "unabridged". Some audiobooks have lower fidelity to the written text through abridgements or productions enhanced with multiple narrators and sound effects. In the 2020s, the rise of generative AI led ebook platforms to introduce a range of synthetic "voices" that could read ebooks yet to be recorded. Audiobooks are distributed as digital downloads on online platforms, as digital loans through libraries, on physical media (mainly compact discs), and on designated audiobook devices like the Playaway.

The earliest audiobooks were phonograph records created by the American Foundation for the Blind. With cassettes in the 1960s and compact discs in the 1980s, the medium began to attract book retailers, and traditional publishers. Audiobooks saw early adoption among visually impaired readers in the United States and Britain, and the market exploded in popularity with digital distribution in the 21st century. U.S. audiobook sales reached $2.22 billion in 2024, a 13% increase over the previous year. The global audiobook market has grown rapidly with an estimated 270 million monthly listeners in 2024.

=== Accessible formats ===
An example of someone using a screen reader showing documents that are inaccessible, readable, and accessible

Accessible publishing is an approach by which books are made available in alternative formats designed to aid or replace the traditional reading process. It is particularly relevant for people who are blind, visually impaired, or otherwise print-disabled. Alternative formats that have been developed to aid different readers include varieties of larger fonts, specialized fonts for certain kinds of reading disabilities, braille, automated audiobooks, and DAISY digital talking books.

Modern ebook software allows a reader to increase the size of most texts. Screen readers can dynamically read aloud any text on a computer screen without a recording needing to be made in advance. Refreshable braille displays allow even those who are deaf-blind to read digital books.

Accessible publishing has been made easier through developments in technology such as print on demand, ebook readers, the XML structured data format, the EPUB3 format, and the Internet.

== Contemporary publishing ==
New books titles per million people

Presently, books are typically produced by a publishing company in order to be put on the market by distributors and bookstores. The publisher negotiates a formal legal agreement with authors to obtain the copyright to works, then arranges for them to be produced and sold. The major steps of the publishing process are: editing and proofreading the work to be published; designing the printed book; manufacturing the books; and selling the books, including marketing and promotion. Each of these steps is usually taken on by third-party companies paid by the publisher. This is in contrast to self-publishing, where an author pays for the production and distribution of their own work and manages some or all steps of the publishing process.

English-language publishing is currently dominated by the so-called "Big Five" publishers: Penguin Random House, Hachette Book Group, HarperCollins, Simon & Schuster, and Macmillan Publishers. They were estimated to make up almost 60 percent of the market for general-readership books in 2021.

=== Design ===
Book design is the art of incorporating the content, style, format, design, and sequence of the various elements of a book into a coherent unit.

==== Layout ====
Diagram of a book: 1. Belly band; 2. Flap; 3. Endpaper; 4. Cover; 5. Head; 6. Fore edge; 7. Tail; 8. Right page (recto if printing is left to right, verso if right to left); 9. Left page (verso if printing is left to right, recto if right to left); 10. Gutter

Modern books are organized according to a particular format called the book's layout. Although there is great variation in layout, modern books tend to adhere to a set of rules with regard to what the parts of the layout are and what their content usually includes. A basic layout will include a front cover, a back cover and the book's content which is called its body copy or content pages. The front cover often bears the book's title (and subtitle, if any) and the name of its author or editor(s). The inside front cover page is usually left blank in both hardcover and paperback books. The next section, if present, is the book's front matter, which includes all textual material after the front cover but not part of the book's content such as a foreword, a dedication, a table of contents, and publisher data such as the book's edition or printing number and place of publication. Between the body copy and the back cover goes the end matter which would include any indices, sets of tables, diagrams, glossaries, or lists of cited works (though an edited book with several authors usually places cited works at the end of each authored chapter). The inside back cover page, like that inside the front cover, is usually blank. The back cover is the usual place for the book's ISBN and maybe a photograph of the author(s)/ editor(s), perhaps with a short introduction to them. Also here often appear plot summaries, barcodes, and excerpted reviews of the book.

The body of a book is usually divided into parts, chapters, sections, and sometimes subsections that are composed of at least a paragraph or more.

==== Size ====
The size of a book is generally measured by the height against the width of a leaf, or sometimes the height and width of its cover. A series of terms commonly used by contemporary libraries and publishers for the general sizes of modern books ranges from folio (the largest), to quarto (smaller) and octavo (still smaller). Historically, these terms referred to the format of the book, a technical term used by printers and bibliographers to indicate the size of a leaf in terms of the size of the original sheet. For example, a quarto was a book printed on sheets of paper folded in half twice, with the first fold at right angles to the second, to produce 4 leaves (or 8 pages), each leaf one fourth the size of the original sheet printed – note that a leaf refers to the single piece of paper, whereas a page is one side of a leaf. Because the actual format of many modern books cannot be determined from examination of the books, bibliographers may not use these terms in scholarly descriptions.

==== Illustration ====
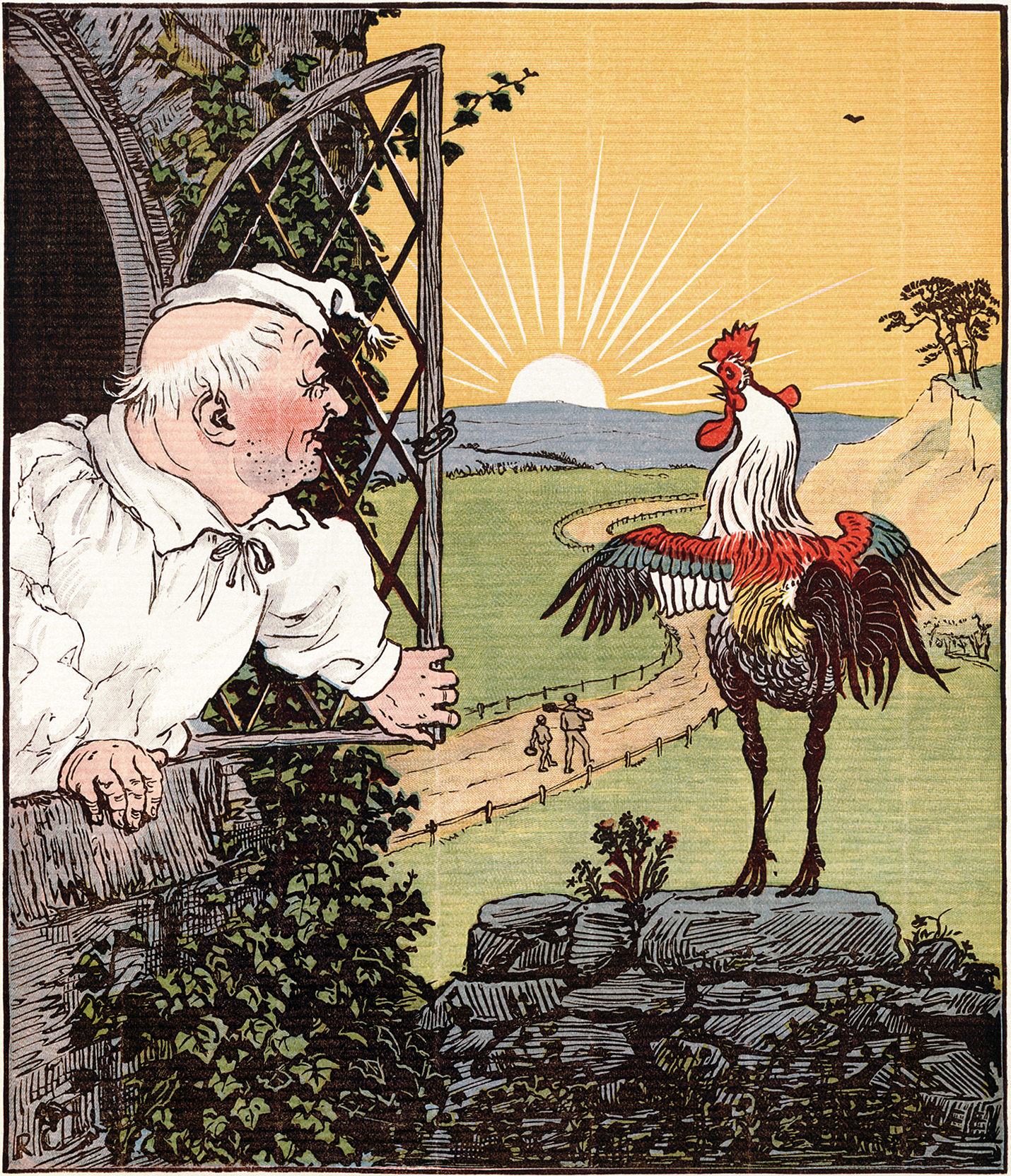
Illustration from "The House that Jack Built" in The Complete Collection of Pictures & Songs; engraving and printing by Edmund Evans, illustration by Randolph Caldecott (1887)

While some form of book illustration has existed since the invention of writing, the modern Western tradition of illustration began with 15th-century block books, in which the book's text and images were cut into the same block. Techniques such as engraving, etching, and lithography have also been influential.

=== Manufacturing ===
Paperback book covers and pages being bound with a hot glue binding machine

Books tend to be manufactured nowadays in a few standard sizes. The sizes of books are usually specified as "trim size": the size of the page after the sheet has been folded and trimmed. Hardcover books have a stiff binding, while paperback books have cheaper, flexible covers. A hardback book will have more steps in its creation than a paperback.

Recent developments in book manufacturing include the development of digital printing. Book pages are printed, in much the same way as an office copier works. Each book is printed in one pass. Digital printing has permitted the manufacture of much smaller quantities than offset. Digital printing has opened up the possibility of print-on-demand, where books are printed only after an order is received.

Modern paper books are printed on paper designed specifically for printing, traditionally off-white or low-white papers, and opaque to minimize the text showing through from the opposite side of the page. Different paper qualities are used depending on the type of book: Machine finished coated papers, woodfree uncoated papers, coated fine papers and special fine papers are common paper grades.

== Content ==
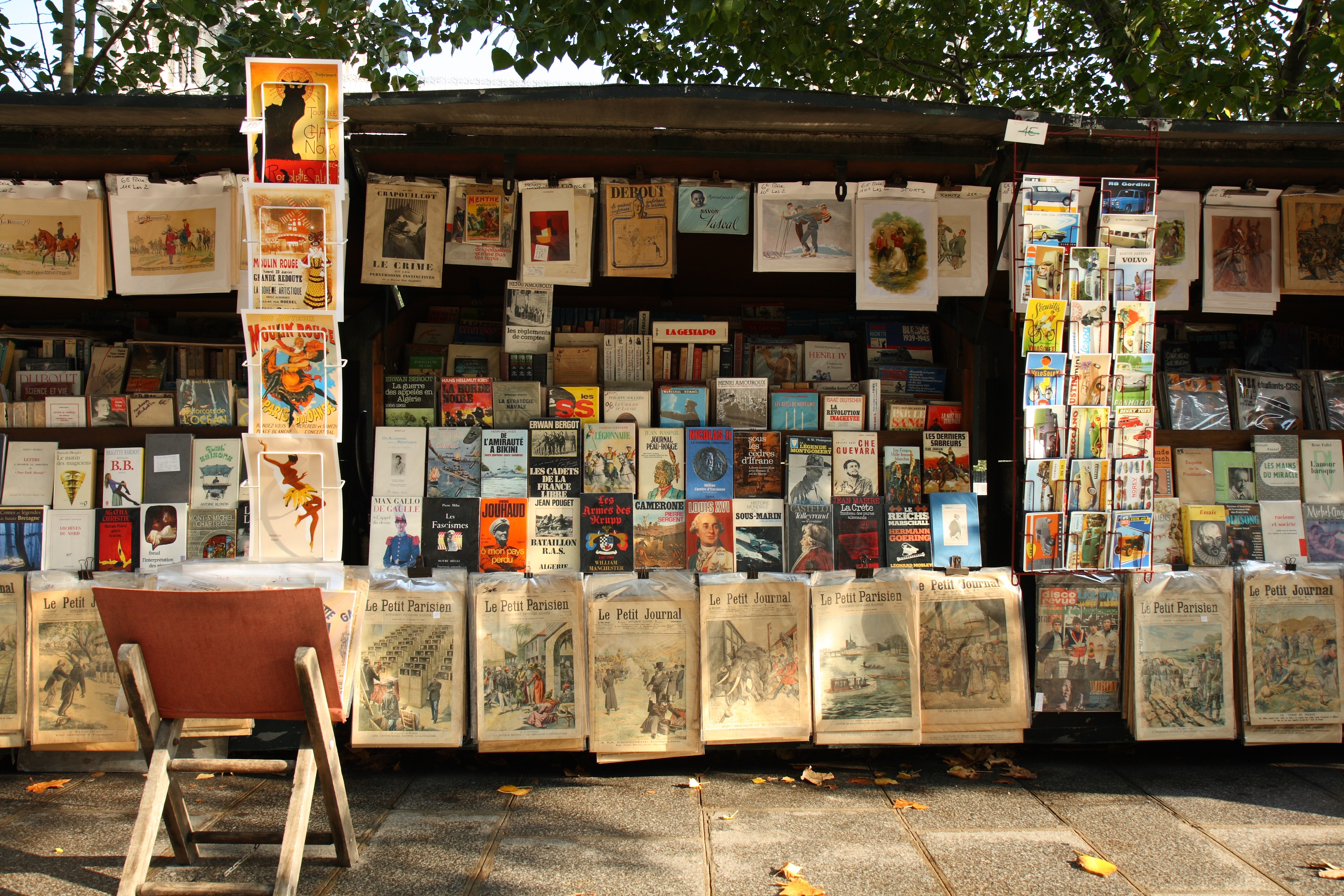
A Bouquiniste in Paris selling secondhand and antiquarian books

Libraries, bookstores, and collections commonly divide books into fiction and non-fiction, though other types exist beyond this. Some stores specialize in buying and selling secondhand or used books. Other books, which remain unpublished or are primarily published as part of different business functions (such as phone directories), may not be sold by bookstores or collected by libraries. Manuscripts, logbooks, and other records may be classified and stored differently by special collections or archives.

=== Fiction ===
Fiction books are invented material, typically narratives. Other literary forms such as poetry are included in the broad category. Most fiction is additionally categorized by literary form and genre.

The novel is the most common form of fiction book. Novels are extended works of narrative fiction, typically featuring a plot, setting, themes, and characters. The novel has had a tremendous impact on entertainment and publishing markets. A novella is a term sometimes used for fiction prose typically between 17,500 and 40,000 words, and a novelette between 7,500 and 17,500. A short story may be any length up to 10,000 words, but these word lengths vary.

Comic books or graphic novels are books in which the story is illustrated. The characters and narrators use speech or thought bubbles to express verbal language.

=== Non-fiction ===
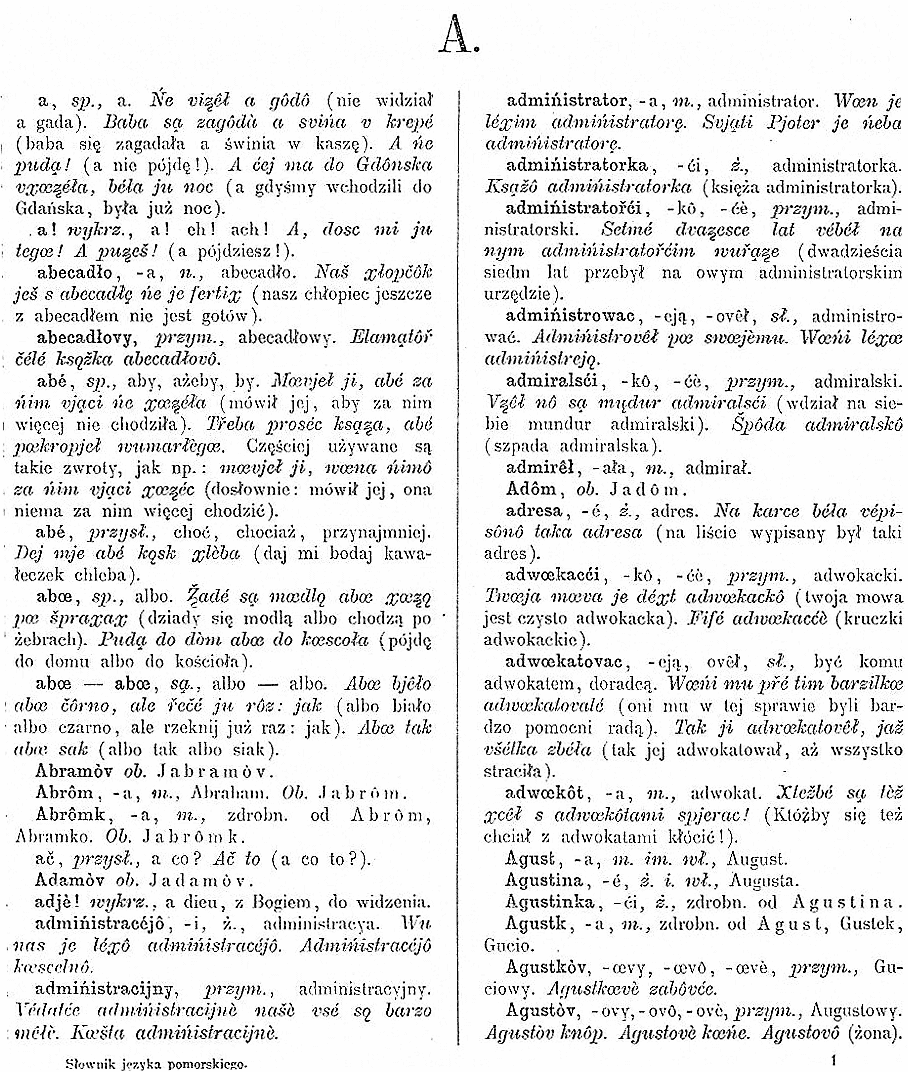
A page from a dictionary

Non-fiction books are in principle based on fact, encompassing subjects such as history, politics, social and cultural issues, as well as autobiographies and memoirs. Nearly all academic literature is non-fiction.

==== References ====
Reference books are non-fiction books intended to be quickly referred to for information, rather than read beginning to end. The writing style used in these works is informative; the authors avoid opinions and the use of the first person and emphasize facts.

An almanac is a very general reference book, usually one-volume, with lists of data and information on many topics. An encyclopedia is a book or set of books designed to have more in-depth articles on many topics. A book listing words, their etymology, meanings, and other information is called a dictionary. An atlas is a book containing a collection of maps. A specialized reference work giving information about a particular field or technique, often intended for professional use, is often called a handbook. Books which try to list references and abstracts in a certain broad area may be called an index, such as Engineering Index, or abstracts such as chemical abstracts and biological abstracts.

==== Technical ====
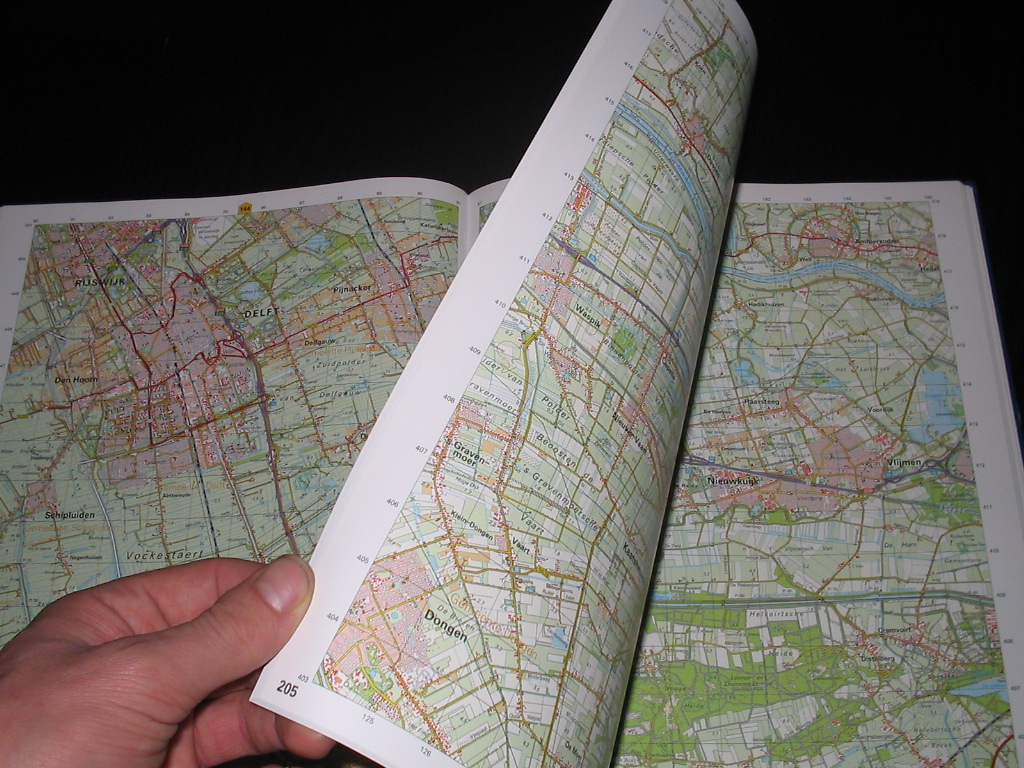
An atlas

Books with technical information on how to do something or how to use some equipment are called instruction manuals. Other popular how-to books include cookbooks and home improvement books.

==== Educational ====
Students often carry textbooks and schoolbooks for study purposes. Lap books are a learning tool created by students. Elementary school pupils often use workbooks, which are published with spaces or blanks to be filled by them for study or homework. In US higher education, it is common for a student to take an exam using a blue book.

==== Religious ====
Religious texts, including scripture, are texts that various religions consider to be of central importance to their religious tradition. They often feature a compilation or discussion of beliefs, ritual practices, moral commandments, and laws, ethical conduct, spiritual aspirations, and admonitions for fostering a religious community.

Hymnals are books with collections of musical hymns that can typically be found in churches. Prayerbooks or missals are books that contain written prayers and are commonly carried by monks, nuns, and other devoted followers or clergy.

=== Children's books ===
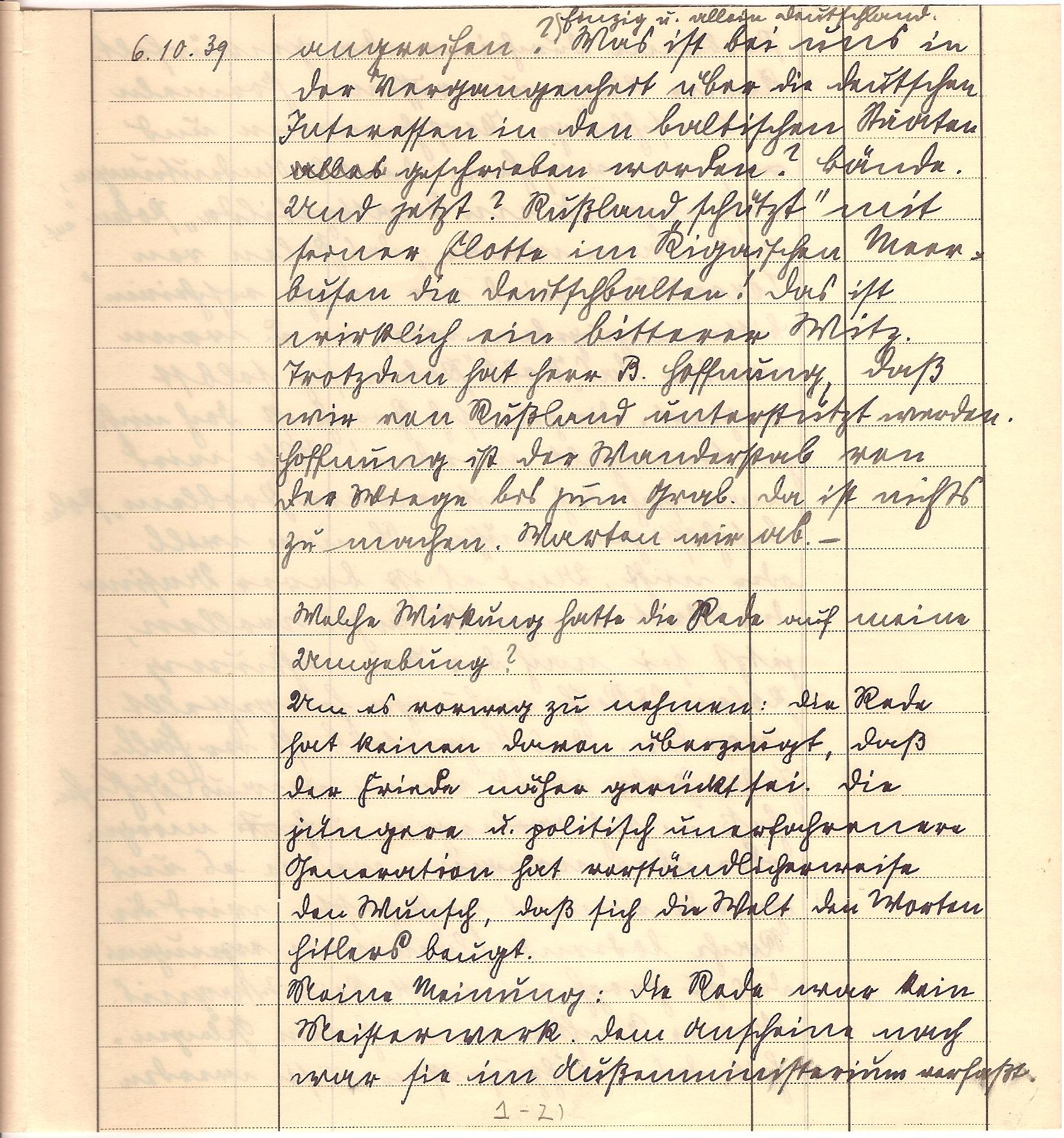
A page from a notebook used as handwritten diary

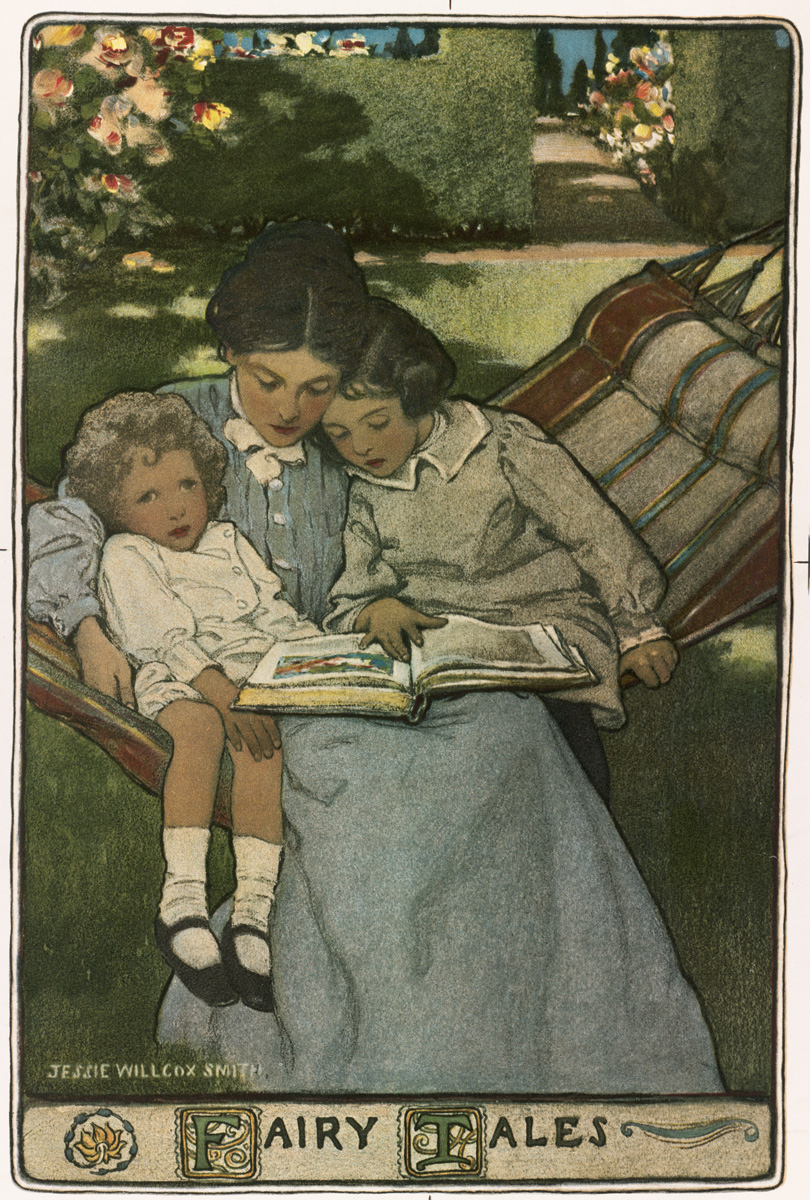
A mother reads to her children in a mid- to late 19th century lithograph by Jessie Willcox Smith.

Children's literature or juvenile literature includes stories, books, magazines, and poems that are created for children. In addition to conventional literary genres, modern children's literature is classified by the intended age of the reader, ranging from picture books for the very young to young adult fiction for those nearing maturity.

Children's literature can be traced to traditional stories like fairy tales, which have only been identified as children's literature since the seventeenth century, and songs, part of a wider oral tradition, which adults shared with children before publishing existed. The development of early children's literature, before printing was invented, is difficult to trace. Even after printing became widespread, many classic "children's" tales were originally created for adults and later adapted for a younger audience. Since the fifteenth century much literature has been aimed specifically at children, often with a moral or religious message. Children's literature has been shaped by religious sources, like Puritan traditions, or by more philosophical and scientific standpoints with the influences of Charles Darwin and John Locke. The late nineteenth and early twentieth centuries are known as the "Golden Age of Children's Literature" because many classic children's books were published then.

== Collection and classification ==
Personal and public libraries, archives, and other forms of book collection have led to the creation of many different organization and classification strategies. In the 19th and 20th centuries, libraries and library professionals systematized book collecting and classification systems to respond to the growing industry. The most widely used system is ISBN, which has provided unique identifiers for books since 1970.

=== Libraries ===
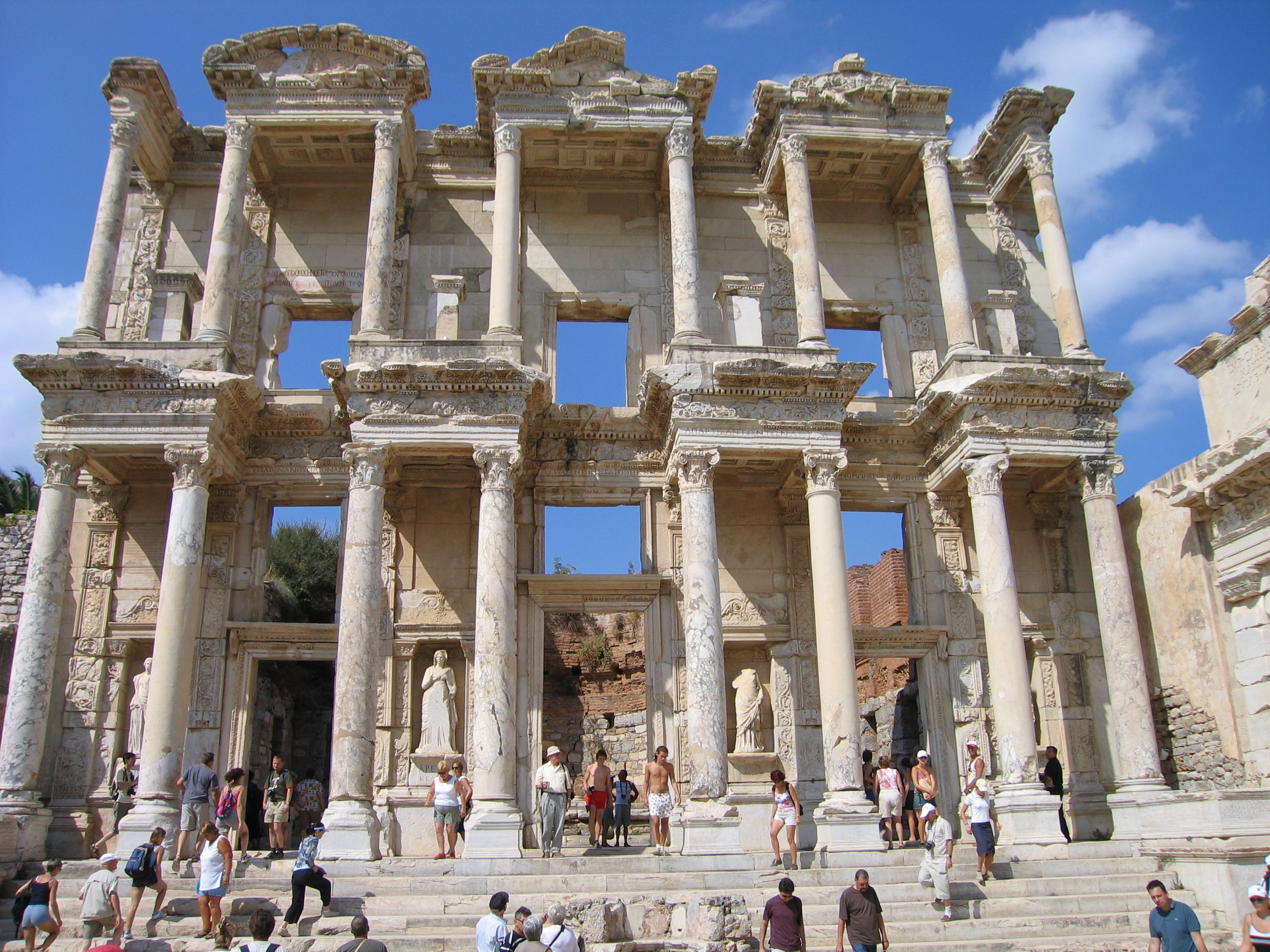
The Library of Celsus in Ephesus, Turkey, was built in 135 AD, and could house around 12,000 scrolls.

A library is a collection of books, and possibly other materials and media, that is accessible for use by its members and members of allied institutions. Libraries provide physical (hard copies) or digital (soft copies) materials, and may be a physical location, a virtual space, or both. A library's collection normally includes printed materials that may be borrowed, and usually also includes a reference section of publications that may only be utilized inside the premises. Resources such as commercial releases of films, television programs, other video recordings, radio, music, and audio recordings may be available in many formats. These include DVDs, Blu-rays, CDs, cassettes, or other applicable formats such as microform. They may also provide access to information, music, or other content held on bibliographic databases.

Libraries can vary widely in size and may be organized and maintained by a public body such as a government, an institution (such as a school or museum), a corporation, or a private individual. In addition to providing materials, libraries also provide the services of librarians who are trained experts in finding, selecting, circulating, and organising information while interpreting information needs and navigating and analyzing large amounts of information with a variety of resources.

Library buildings often provide quiet areas for studying, as well as common areas for group study and collaboration, and may provide public facilities for access to their electronic resources, such as computers and access to the Internet.

The library's clientele and general services offered vary depending on its type: users of a public library have different needs from those of a special library or academic library, for example. Libraries may also be community hubs, where programs are made available and people engage in lifelong learning. Modern libraries extend their services beyond the physical walls of the building by providing material accessible by electronic means, including from home via the Internet.

=== Identification and classification ===
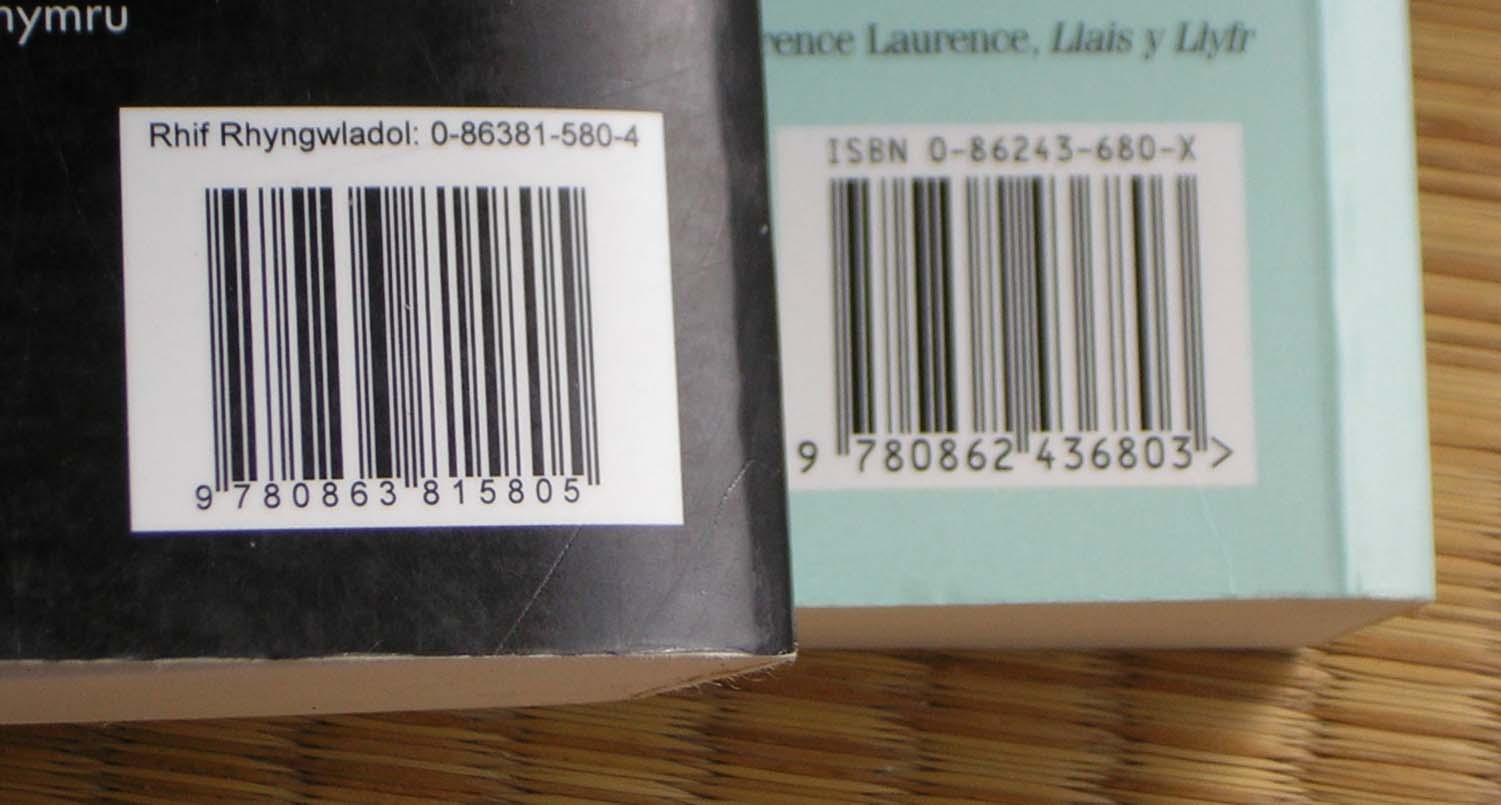
ISBN with barcode

In 2011, the International Federation of Library Associations and Institutions (IFLA) created the International Standard Bibliographic Description (ISBD) to standardize descriptions in bibliographies and library catalogs. Each book is specified by an International Standard Book Number, or ISBN, which is meant to be unique to every edition of every book produced by participating publishers, worldwide. It is managed by the ISBN Society. An ISBN has four parts: the first part is the country code, the second is the publisher code, and the third is the title code. The last part is a check digit, and can take values from 0–9 and X (10). The EAN Barcodes numbers for books are derived from the ISBN by prefixing 978, for Bookland, and calculating a new check digit.

Commercial publishers in industrialized countries generally assign ISBNs to their books, so buyers may presume that the ISBN is part of a total international system, with no exceptions. However, many government publishers, in industrial as well as developing countries, do not participate fully in the ISBN system and publish books that do not have ISBNs. A large or public collection requires a catalogue. Codes called "call numbers" relate the books to the catalogue, and determine their locations on the shelves. Call numbers are based on a Library classification system. The call number is placed on the spine of the book, normally a short distance before the bottom, and inside. Institutional or national standards, such as ANSI/NISO Z39.41 – 1997, establish the correct way to place information (such as the title, or the name of the author) on book spines, and on "shelvable" book-like objects, such as containers for DVDs, video tapes and software.

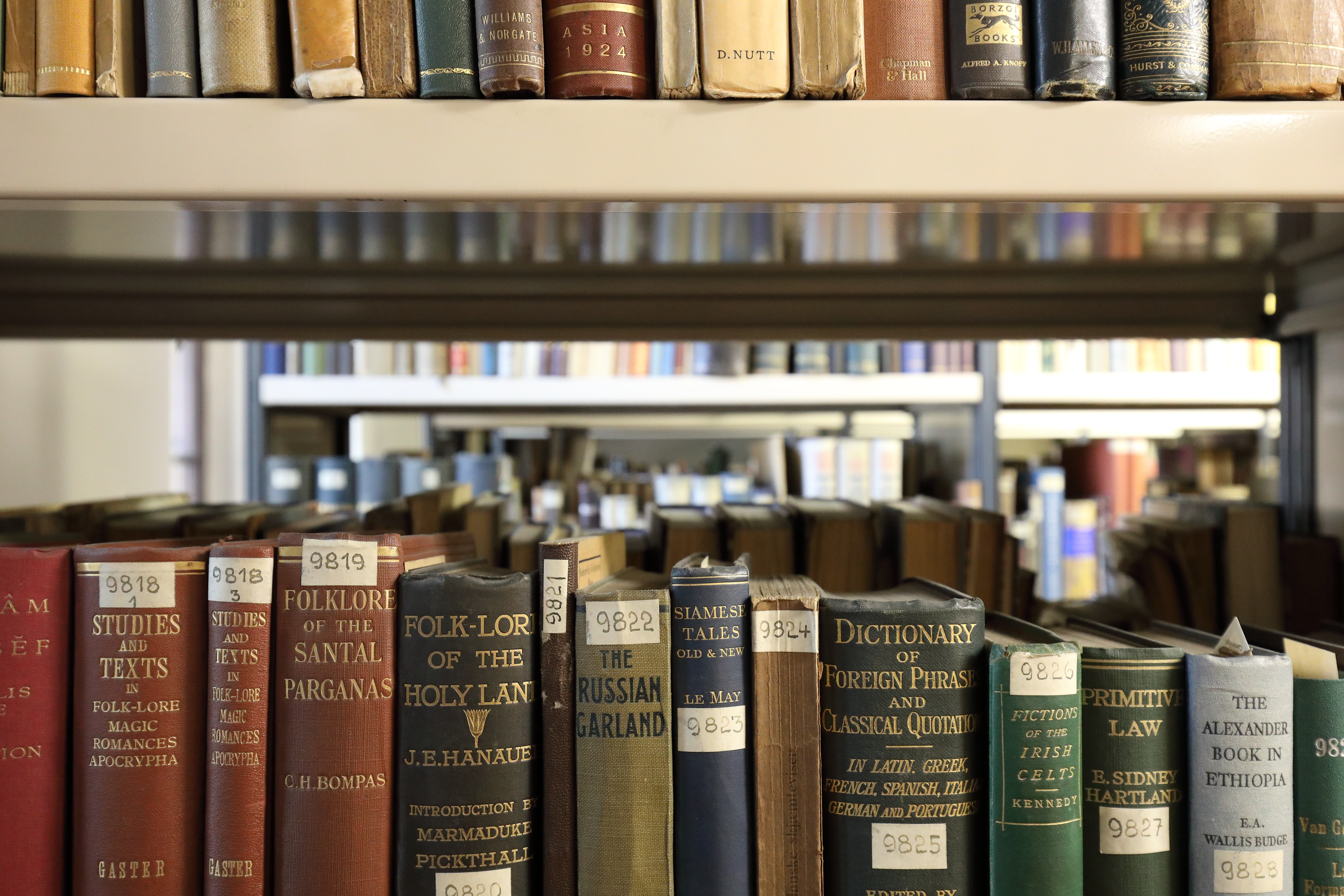
Books on library shelves and call numbers visible on the spines

One of the earliest and most widely known systems of cataloguing books is the Dewey Decimal System. Another widely known system is the Library of Congress Classification system. Both systems are biased towards subjects which were well represented in US libraries when they were developed, and hence have problems handling new subjects, such as computing, or subjects relating to other cultures. Information about books and authors can be stored in databases like online general-interest book databases. Metadata, which means "data about data" is information about a book. Metadata about a book may include its title, ISBN or other classification number (see above), the names of contributors (author, editor, illustrator) and publisher, its date and size, the language of the text, its subject matter, etc.

=== Conservation ===
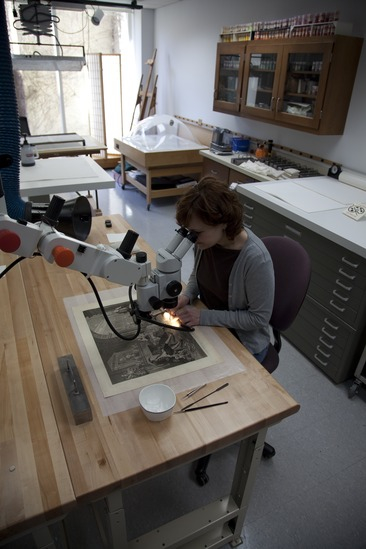
A conservation technician examining an artwork under a microscope at the Indianapolis Museum of Art

The conservation and restoration of books, manuscripts, documents, and ephemera is dedicated to extending the life of books of historical and personal value. The main goal of conservation is to extend the lifespan of the object, while keeping any additions reversible. It relies on bookbinding, restoration, paper chemistry, and other material technologies including preservation and archival techniques. Active conservation can reverse damage and prevent further damage. Historically, book restoration techniques were less formalized and carried out by various roles and training backgrounds. Nowadays, the conservation of paper documents and books is often performed by a professional conservator-restorer.

== Social aspects ==
=== Literary criticism ===
A genre of arts criticism, literary criticism is the study, evaluation, and interpretation of literature. Modern literary criticism is often influenced by literary theory, which is the philosophical analysis of literature's goals and methods. Although the two activities are closely related, literary critics are not always, and have not always been, theorists. Scholars disagree on whether literary theory is a separate field of inquiry.

=== Book reviews ===
A book review is a form of literary criticism in which a book is described, and usually further analyzed based on content, style, and merit. A book review may be a primary source, an opinion piece, a summary review, or a scholarly view. Books can be reviewed for printed periodicals, magazines, and newspapers, as school work, or for book websites on the Internet. A book review's length may vary from a single paragraph to a substantial essay. Such a review may evaluate the book based on personal taste. Reviewers may use the occasion of a book review for an extended essay that can be closely or loosely related to the subject of the book, or to promulgate their ideas on the topic of a fiction or non-fiction work. Beyond their function as literary commentary, book reviews are recognized in information science for providing descriptive depth that exceeds standard bibliographic records. In digital library systems, the integration of book review content into discovery layers supports resource identification and improves search accuracy by bridging formal classification with user-centered language.

Some journals are devoted to book reviews, and reviews are indexed in databases such as the Book Review Index and Kirkus Reviews; but many more book reviews can be found in newspaper and scholarly databases such as Arts and Humanities Citation Index, Social Sciences Citation Index, and discipline-specific databases.

=== Book censorship and bans ===
Book censorship is the act of some authority taking measures to suppress ideas and information within a book. Censorship is "the regulation of free speech and other forms of entrenched authority". Censors typically identify as either a concerned parent, community members who react to a text without reading, or local or national organizations. Books have been censored by authoritarian dictatorships to silence dissent, such as the People's Republic of China, Nazi Germany, and the Soviet Union. Books are most often censored for age appropriateness, offensive language, sexual content, amongst other reasons. Similarly, religions may issue lists of banned books, such as the historical example of the Catholic Church's Index Librorum Prohibitorum and bans of such books as Salman Rushdie's The Satanic Verses by Ayatollah Khomeini, which do not always carry legal force. Censorship can be enacted at the national or subnational level as well, and can carry legal penalties. In many cases, the authors of these books could face harsh sentences, exile from the country, or even execution.

==== Book burning ====
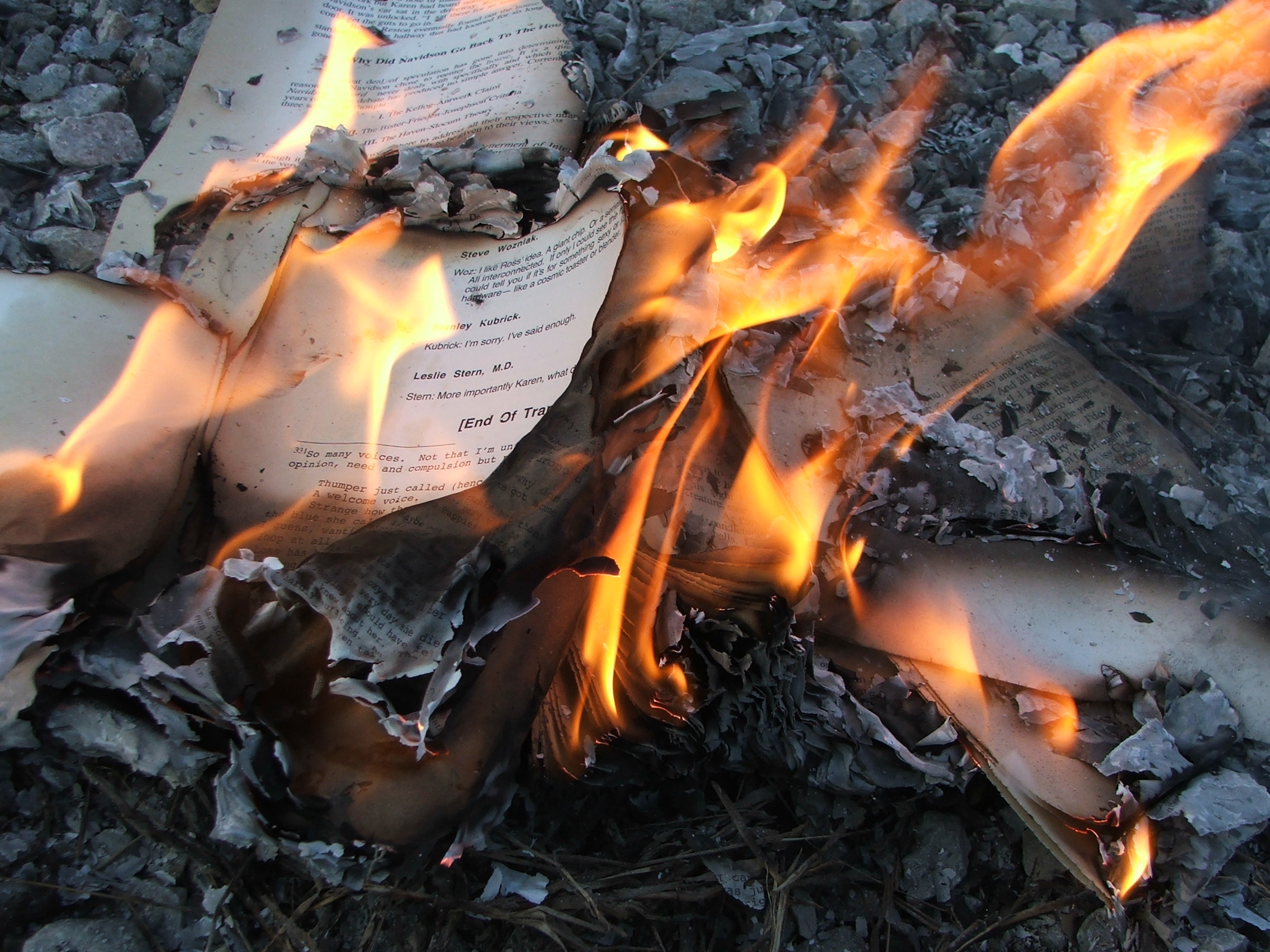
A copy of House of Leaves being burned

Book burning is the deliberate destruction by fire of books or other written materials, usually carried out in a public context. The burning of books represents an element of censorship and usually proceeds from a cultural, religious, or political opposition to the materials in question. Book burning can be an act of contempt for the book's contents or author, intended to draw wider public attention to this opposition, or conceal the information contained in the text from being made public, such as diaries or ledgers. Burning and other methods of destruction are together known as biblioclasm or libricide.

In some cases, the destroyed works are irreplaceable and their burning constitutes a severe loss to cultural heritage. Examples include the burning of books and burying of scholars under China's Qin dynasty (213–210 BCE), the destruction of the House of Wisdom during the Mongol siege of Baghdad (1258), the destruction of Aztec codices by Itzcoatl (1430s), the burning of Maya codices on the order of bishop Diego de Landa (1562), and the burning of Jaffna Public Library in Sri Lanka (1981).

In other cases, such as the Nazi book burnings, copies of the destroyed books survive, but the instance of book burning becomes emblematic of a harsh and oppressive regime which is seeking to censor or silence some aspect of prevailing culture.

== See also ==
- Accessible Books Consortium
- Book desert
- Book Lovers Day
- Books for the Blind
- Books to Prisoners
- Independent bookstore
- Lists of books
- Open access book
- Outline of books
- World Book Capital
- World Book Day
