= Pi Notebook =

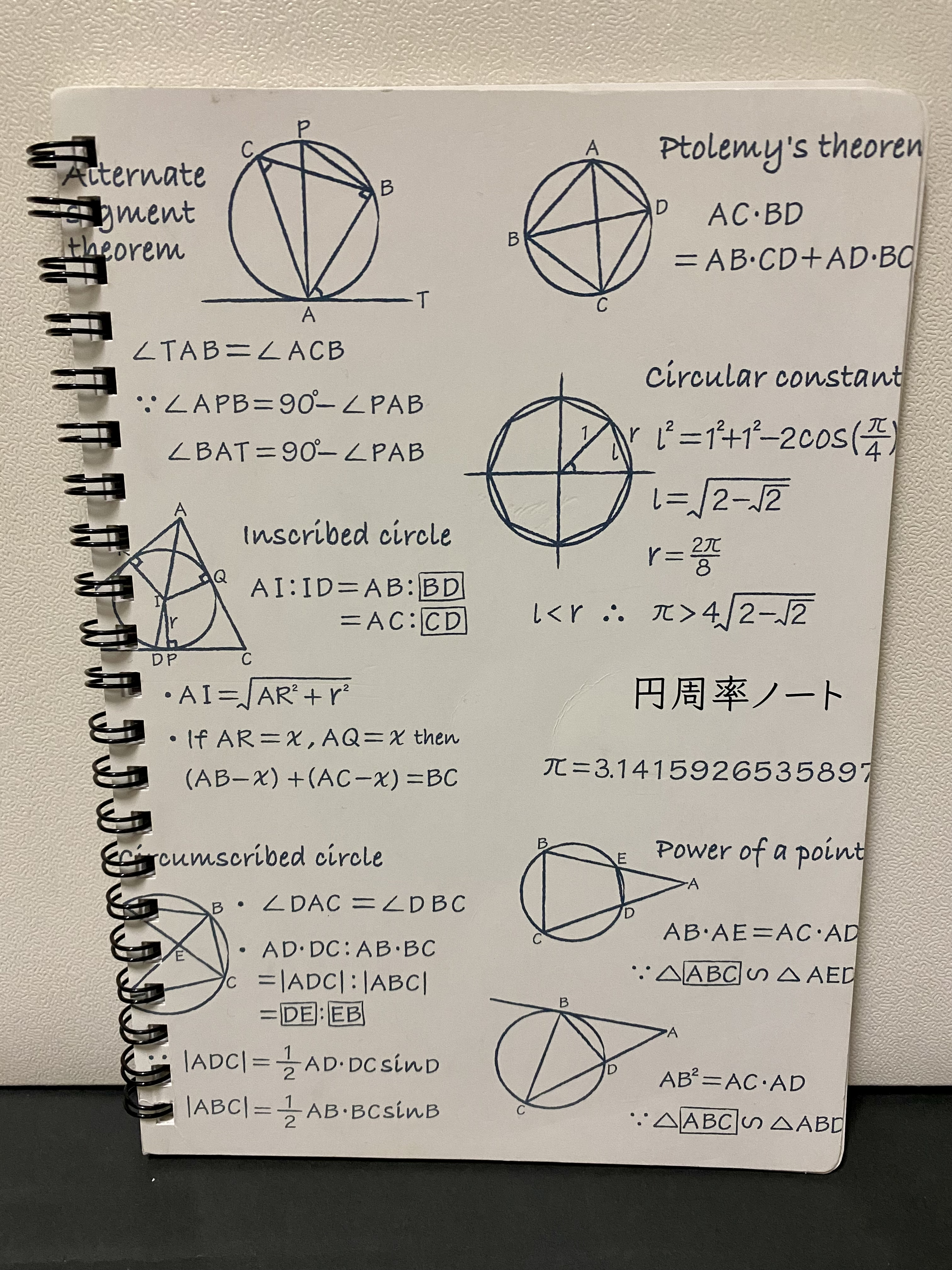
Pi Notebook

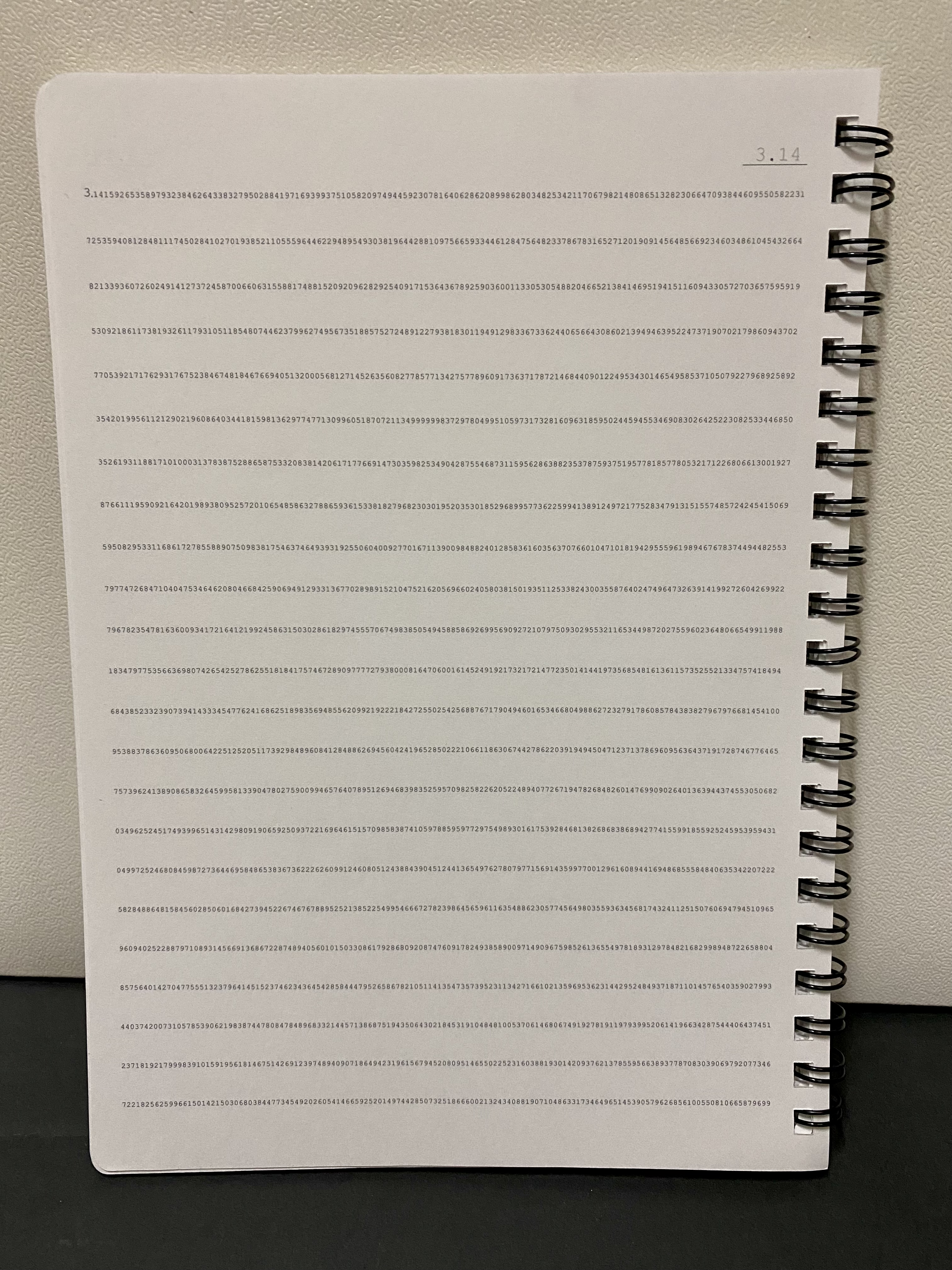
A page from a Pi Notebook. The ruled lines are the digits of pi.

Pi Notebook is the trade name of a notebook produced by Japanese stationery manufacturer KING JIM and sold by Loft, which began selling the product in June 2017.

== Overview ==
The notebook is characterised by its ruled lines formed from the digits of pi (3.1415926535...). Originally, the product was forfeited, however, it received a string of requests for commercialization after being posted on Twitter on March 14, 2017, Pi Day, and was subsequently released in June of the same year as a collaborative product with Loft.

== History ==
=== Background to Launch ===
The Pi Notebook was initially proposed at a meeting aired on June 12, 2016, on TBS's TV program Gacchiri Monday! However, the project was abandoned before it went up for commercialization presentation.

However, the response was overwhelming when KING JIM posted a photo of it on Twitter on March 14, 2017, Pi Day. As of March 17, three days after the tweet, the number of retweets exceeded 12,000. King Jim commented on the post, "We are always trying to create products with a free spirit. We hope this post conveys that atmosphere."

A representative from Loft saw this tweet and contacted the company, and commercialization of the product was confirmed on March 14. Following this, King Jim's designers came up with the cover, details, and other designs.

On June 19 of the same year, King Jim and Loft announced that they would commercialize 2,000 copies of the product.

=== Post launch ===
On June 23, four days after the announcement that the notebook would go on sale, a pre-sale was held on the Loft Net Store, an E-commerce site of Loft, and at Ginza Loft, which opened on the same day, for 314 yen excluding tax. The Ginza store sold a limited number of 314 copies and used POP advertising, hand-drawn by King Jim's Twitter representative. The Loft online store, which began selling at 11:00 on the same day, sold out just 17 minutes later, and the Ginza Loft also sold out within the day of its release.

Later, on July 25, the product went on sale at all Loft stores nationwide and at the Loft online store for 380 yen, excluding tax.

Following the massive success of the Pi notebook, on March 9, 2018, the company began selling its second product, the "Miscellaneous Ruled Notebook," in which "Japanese era name," "Ogura Hyakunin Isshu," "prime numbers," "country names," and "city names" form the ruled lines of the notebook. Furthermore, at the "Stationery Festival 2020" event held at the Loft in July and August 2020, the company released its third series of notebooks, in which "Elemental Symbols," "New Japanese era name," and "Jōyō kanji " form the ruled lines.

== Reaction and Evaluation ==
In Asahi Weekly's interview of Loft for its "Loft Heisei Hit Items" in January 2018, the Pi notebook was listed in the stationery category. In addition, the miscellaneous ruled notebooks recorded total sales exceeding 25,000 during the three months from their release to the end of May 2018.

Some believe that this rejected project was able to lead to commercialization due to King Jim's official X account's daily interactions with users and its resulting fan base.

== Products ==
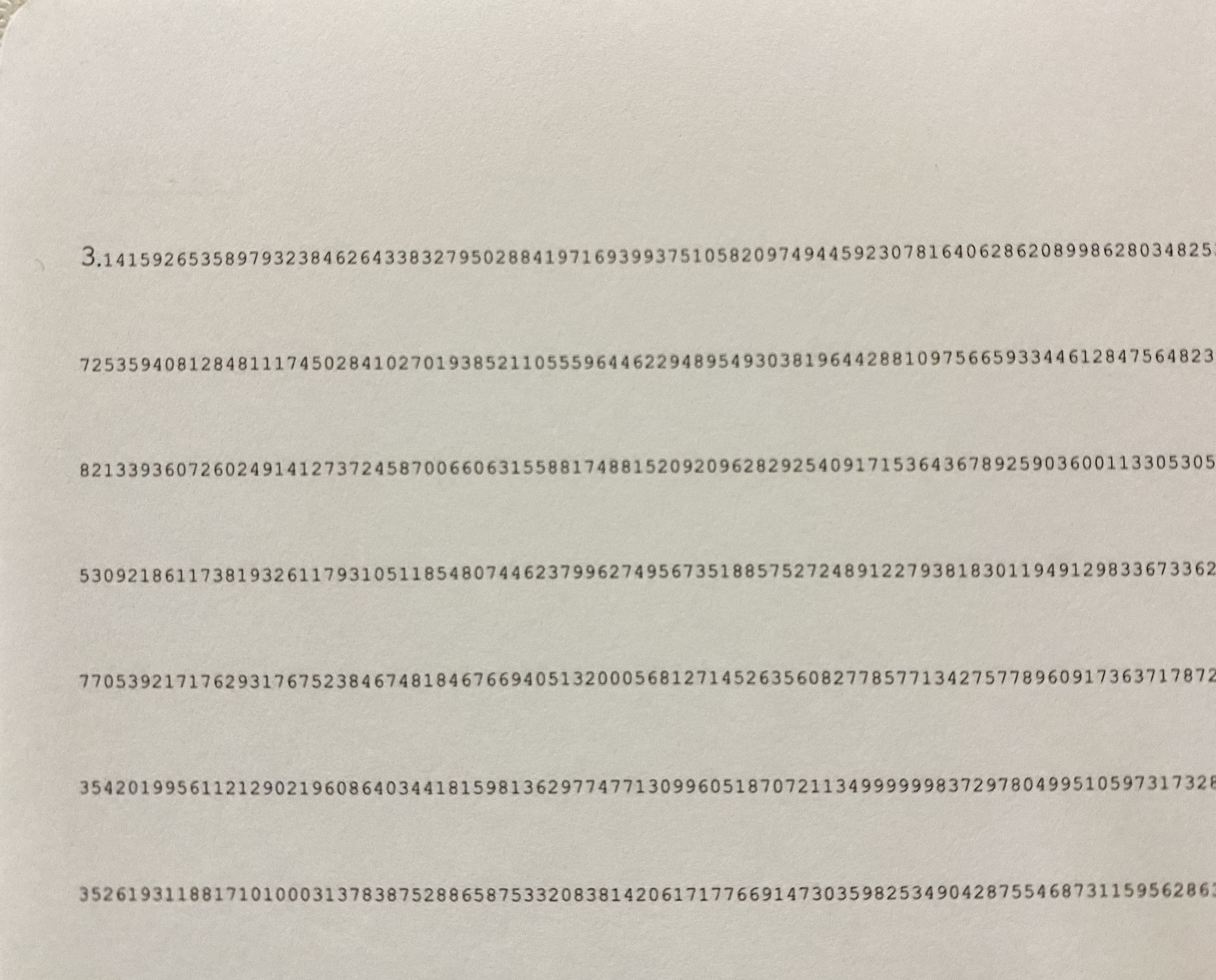
Enlarged view of the ruled lines of the pi notebook. From the upper left, "3.1415926535..." follows.

Pi notebook
Sales began in June 2017. It is available in two colors, green and white, inspired by blackboards and whiteboards, with each priced at 380 yen, excluding tax. It has 50 pages, is A5 in size, and has twin-ring binding. On the notebook's cover, in addition to pi, there are various circle-related mathematical formulae and figures.
The ruled lines of the notebook contain a series of pi numbers (3.1415926535...), which are not too conspicuous, but adjusted to a size where they can still be read. The numbers on a single page of this notebook amount to about 3,800 digits. "3.14" is also printed in the date section.

Miscellaneous ruled notebooks
The second volume was sold beginning March 2018, and the third July 2020. The second volume's "Japanese era name" lists all the Japanese era names from Taika to Heisei, "Hyakunin Isshu" lists all the waka poems by 100 poets, "Prime Numbers" lists prime numbers from 2 to 5107, "Country Names" lists the 193 member countries of the United Nations as of May 2017, and "City Names" lists all Japanese city names in national, local public organization code order. The third volume includes "Elemental Symbols," "New Japanese era name," and "Jōyō kanji ".
