= Coil binding =

Book binding style

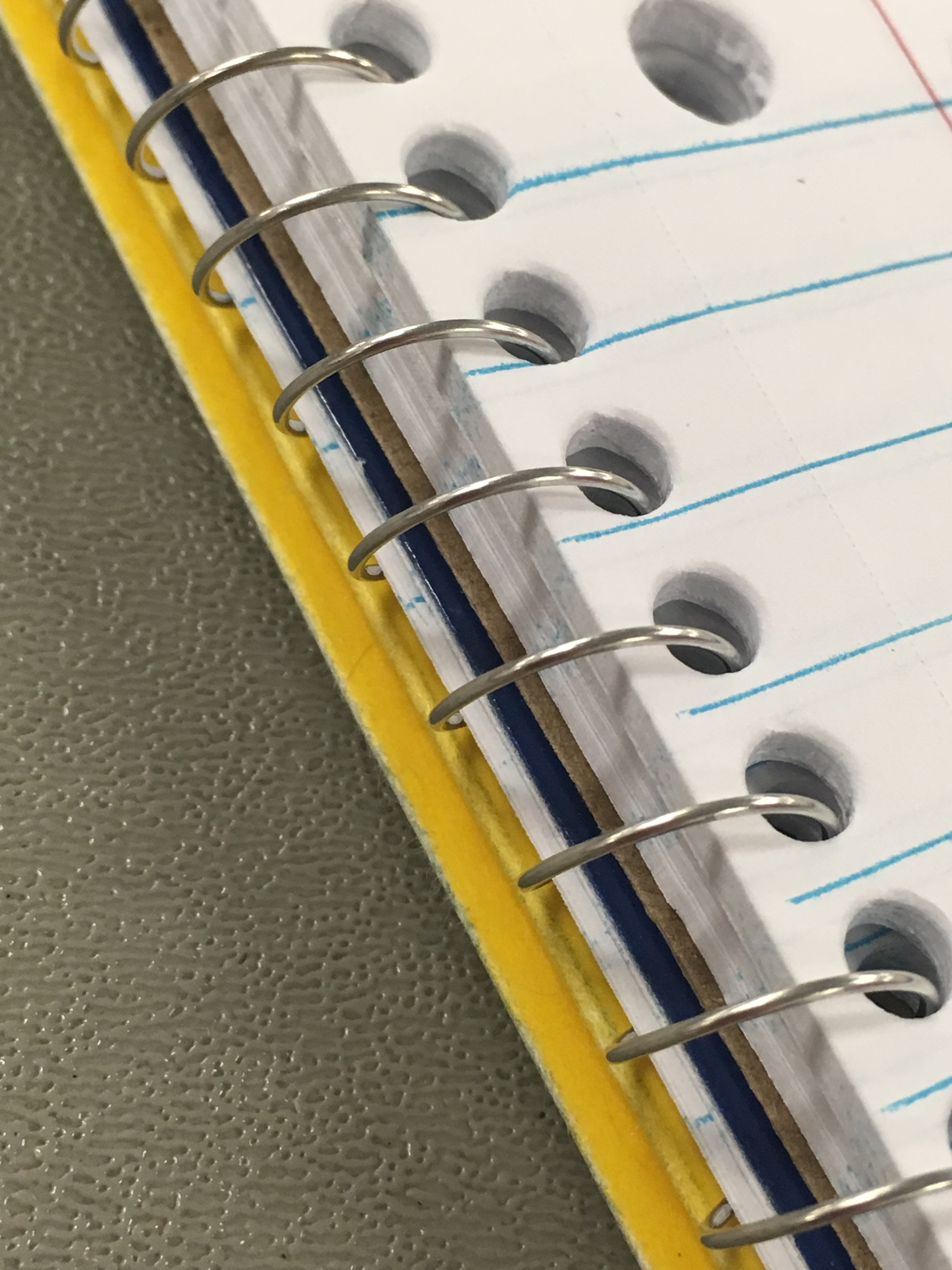
A spiral bound notebook

Coil binding, also known as spiral binding, is a commonly used book binding style for documents. This binding style is known by a number of names (some trademarked) including spiral coil, color coil, colorcoil, ez-coil, plastic coil, spiral binding, and coilbind.

== Usage ==
Documents bound with helical coil (usually called spiral coil) can open flat on a desk or table and offer 360 degree rotation for easy note taking. This binding style is durable and is often used for professionally bound documents that need to be mailed. The coil used for this style of binding are made of high-quality PVC plastic and offer a secure high-quality and professionally bound book while binding documents up to 2 inches thick. Spiral coil binding spines are also available in more colors and sizes than other binding styles.

== History ==
Spiral Binding Company, started in 1932, was "the first mechanical binding company in the United States". It created the original metal spiral-coil binding and later the Spiralastic, a popular plastic coil to replace wire during World War II. Today, it is a print-finishing, graphic-arts, and presentation products company based in Totowa, New Jersey, where its headquarters are located. In addition, it maintains two sales and distribution centers in California and Illinois.

== Coil ==
One of the strengths of spiral coil binding is that the supplies are available in a variety of lengths. Most users purchase spiral coils in twelve inch lengths. This spine is inserted onto an eleven-inch document and the excess length of coil is cut and crimped at each end of the book. However, the forming process for creating spiral coil binding elements allows them to be created in virtually any length. Spiral coils are sometimes made from low-carbon steel. Spiral coil binding supplies are also available in a wide variety of colors.

== Equipment ==
Plastic spiral binding is a three-step process: punch, insert, crimp. First, a punch creates holes along the edge of the document. Second, a coil inserter spins the coils through the holes. Third, a pair of coil crimping pliers or a crimping machine is used to cut off the excess coil and crimp the end to prevent the coil from coming loose from the document. There are also more automated systems that will insert and cut and crimp the coil in one process and even some fully automated systems that will punch, insert, and crimp for the very high volume users.

== See also ==
- Comb binding
- Wire binding
