= Lap book =

Student-created single-subject book

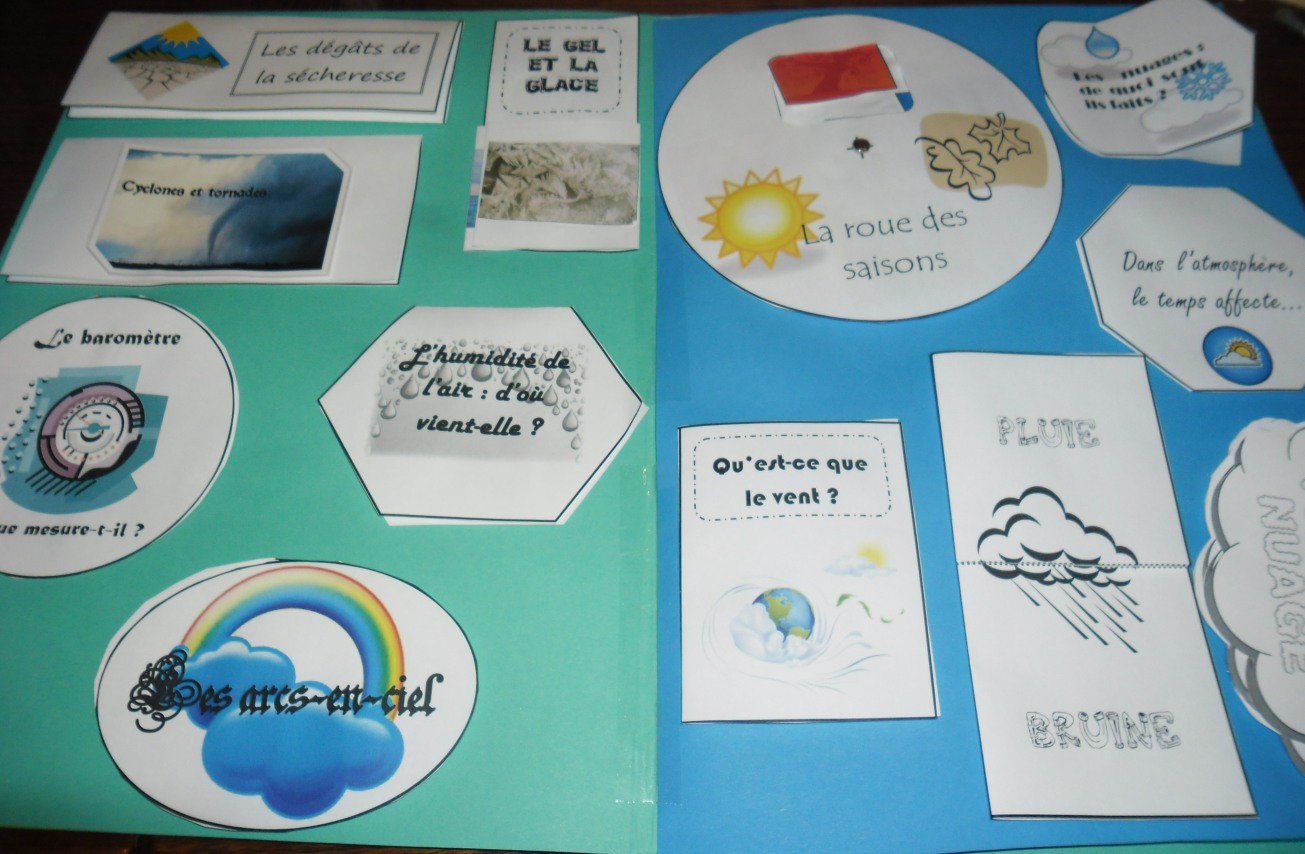
Interior pages of a weather lapbook.

A lap book, layer book, flap book, or shutter book is a type of single-subject book created by a student, generally as a supplement to a curriculum.

A lap book generally consists of a paperboard folder such as a file folder with small pieces of folded paper glued inside. These folded papers may contain facts, diagrams, illustrations, etc. related to the subject. Lap books can be adapted for any subject and grade level. Teachers and parents who use lap books with students say that they enhance creativity and critical thinking while integrating subjects such as science, language, history, geography, and mathematics, depending on the subject of the lap book.
