= Book Lovers Day =

Unofficial holiday

- Official name: National Book Lovers Day
- Also called: BLD
- Observed by: All
- Type: International
- Significance: observed to encourage bibliophiles
- Date: 9 August
- Frequency: Annual

Book Lovers Day (or National Book Lovers Day) is celebrated on 9 August every year. This is an unofficial holiday observed to encourage bibliophiles to celebrate reading and literature. People are advised to put away their smartphones and every possible technological distraction and pick up a book to read. Book Lovers Day is widely recognized on global scale yet its origin and creator remain unknown to date.

A related celebration, International Literacy Day, follows a month later on 8 September each year.
