= Wire binding =

Book binding method

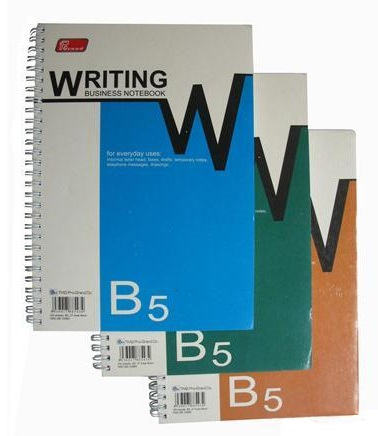
Wire-bound notebooks (3:1)

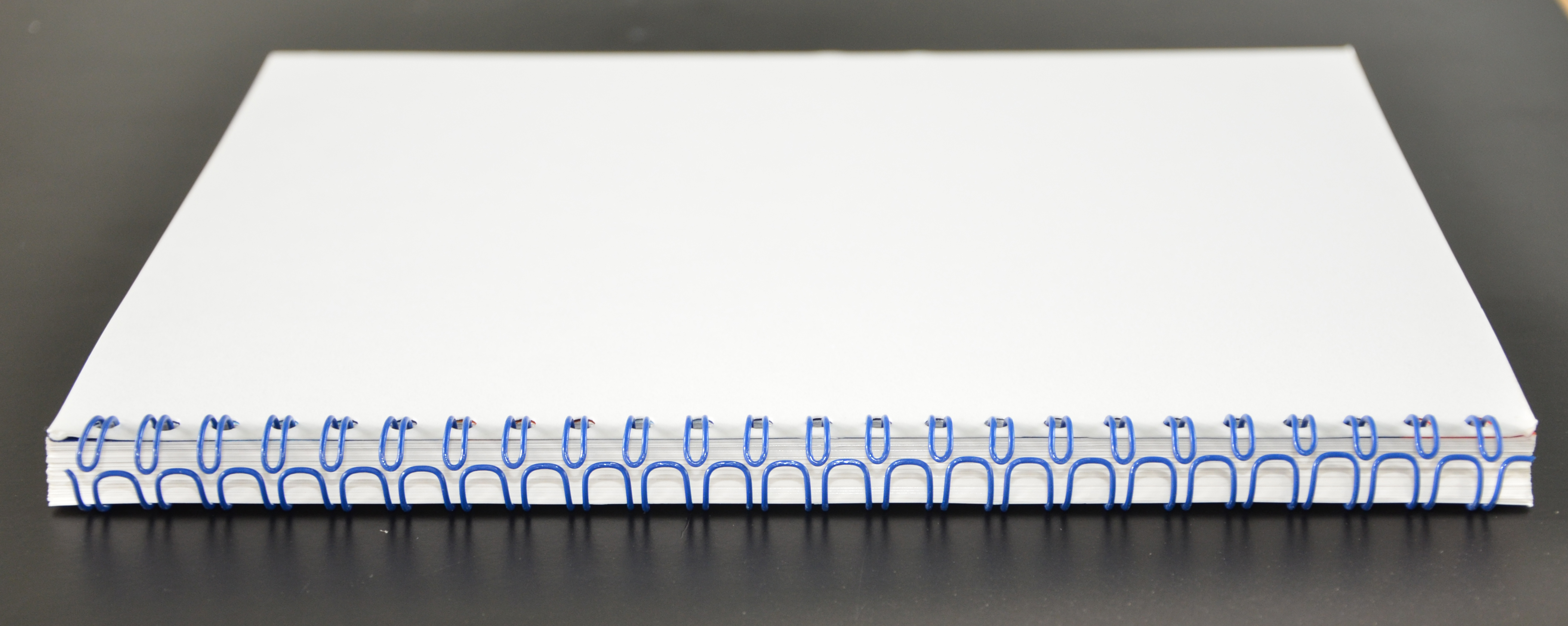
Wire binding

Wire binding is a popular commercial book binding method, and is known by various names, including double loop wire, double-o, ring wire, twin loop wire, wire comb, wire-o, wirebind and wiro. With this binding method, users insert their punched pages onto a C-shaped spine, and then use a wire closer to squeeze the spine until it is round. Documents that are bound with wire binding will open completely flat on a desk, and allow for 360 degree rotation of bound pages, without the side protrusion produced by spiral binding.

== Hole patterns and pitches ==
There are three common hole patterns used in binding documents with double loop wire. Each hole pattern has specific sizes and applications where it is best suited.

=== 3:1 pitch (3 holes per inch) ===
The 3:1 pitch hole pattern is most commonly used for binding small documents with double loop wire. Spines are available in sizes between 4.8 mm (3/16 in) and 14 mm (9/16 in) in diameter. The hole pattern can use either square or round holes.

=== 2:1 pitch (2 holes per inch) ===
Although a 2:1 pitch hole pattern is most commonly used for binding larger documents, it can also be used for smaller books. It is most commonly found in sizes from 16 mm (5/8 in) to 32 mm (1 1/4 in). However, a couple of manufacturers make special small sizes, with diameters down to 6.4 mm (1/4 in). Renz GmbH own the registered trademark for One Pitch®, which is a brand describing 1/4" to 1/2" sizes.

=== 19-loop wire ===
In the past, some comb binding machines would come with a wire closer. These machines were designed to be used with 19-loop wire, which uses the same pattern as for plastic comb binding. This hole pattern will have 19 longer rectangular holes that are on 14 mm (9/16 in) centers, for a total length of 280 mm (11 in). This style of binding used to be called Ibiwire, which was Ibico's name for it. However, when Ibico was purchased by the General Binding Corporation, this type of supplies was discontinued. Today, 19-loop wire is commonly called Spiral-O Wire.

== Wire binding equipment ==
In order to bind documents with double loop wire, a binding machine and a wire closer are required. Smaller organizations will often choose a small manual wire binding machine that offers a manual hole punch and a built-in wire closer. Medium-sized users will often choose a wire binding machine with an electric punch and built-in wire closer. The highest volume wire binding users such as binderies, print shops and in-plant printers will usually separate the punching and finishing stages of the binding process, in order to increase productivity. These users will often use a heavy-duty modular interchangeable die punch or an automated punching system, along with either a manual or an electric wire closing machine.
