= Comb binding =

Method of binding pages into a book

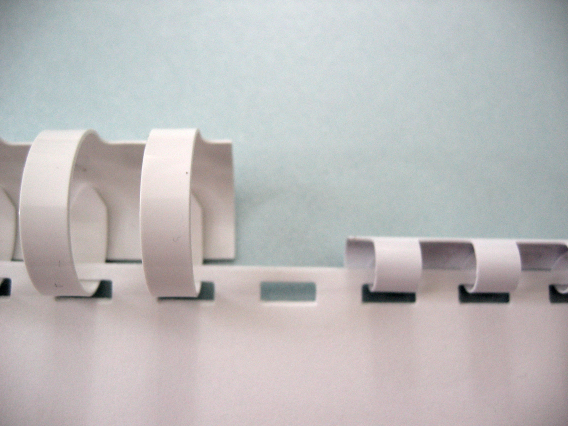
Two spine sizes (the larger has the capacity to bind several hundred sheets)

Spine capacity
Inches	Millimeters	Sheets of paper
3/16"	4	16
1/4"	6	25
5/16"	8	40
3/8"	10	55
7/16"	11	70
1/2"	12	85
9/16"	14	100
5/8"	16	125
3/4"	20	150
7/8"	22	175
1"	25	200
1 1/8"	28	250
1 1/4"	32	275
1 1/2"	38	325
1 3/4"	45	375
2"	51	425

Comb binding (sometimes referred to as "cerlox" or "surelox" binding) is one of many ways to bind pages together into a book. This method uses round plastic spines with 19 rings (for US Letter size) or 21 rings (for A4 size) and a hole puncher that makes rectangular holes. Comb binding is sometimes referred to as plastic comb binding or spiral comb binding.

== Binding process ==
To bind a document, the user first punches holes in the paper with a specialized hole punch. Pages must be punched a few at a time with most of these machines. If hard covers are desired, they must be punched as well. In bulk applications, a paper drilling machine may be used.

Then the user chooses a spine size that will match the document. Standard sizes are 4.8 mm (3/16 in) (for 16 sheets of 20# paper) up to 51 mm (2 in) (for 425 sheets). Spine lengths are generally 280 mm (11 in) to match the length of letter-size paper.

The rings on the spine open and insert into the holes in the page, then rest against the body of the spine, resulting in a closure that can be opened again for making changes to the book.

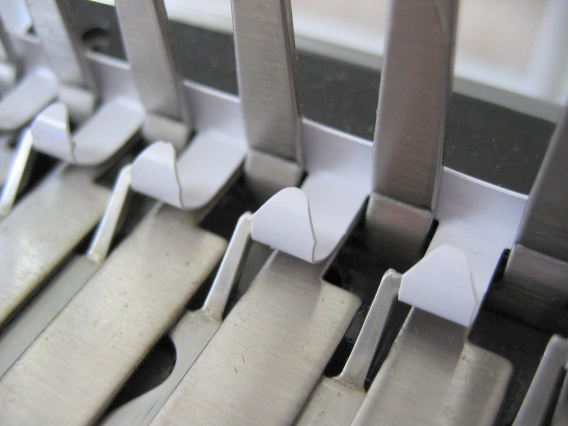
Machine opening the spine

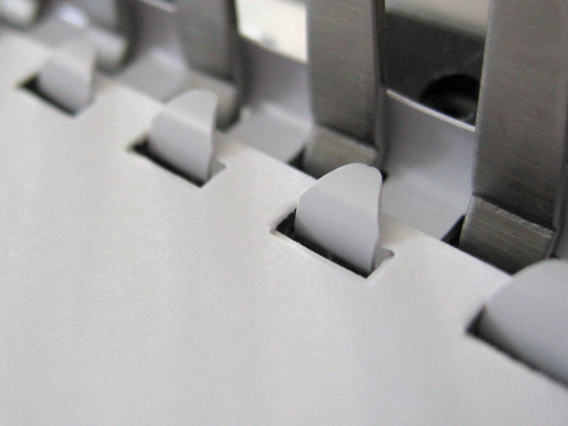
Pre-punched paper with spine rings through holes

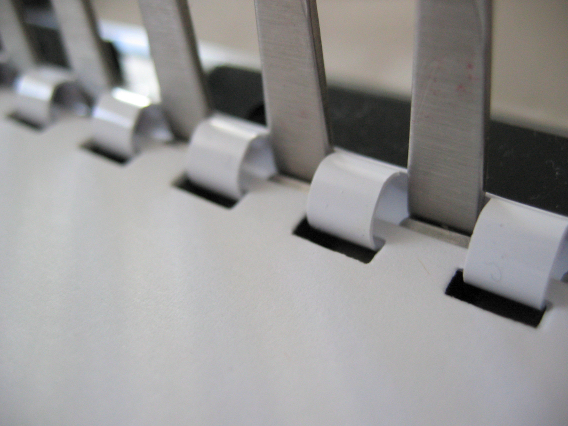
Rings closed on paper

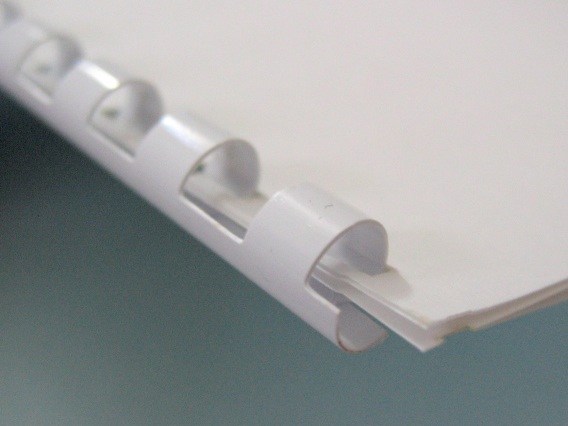
Completed book out of machine

== Comparison with other punch binds ==
With this bind, the book lies flat but cannot be opened 360 degrees. For a book that can be opened such that the covers touch, a spine that does not have an obstructive body, such as a coil binding, is a better option.
