= Manila folder =

File folder designed to contain documents

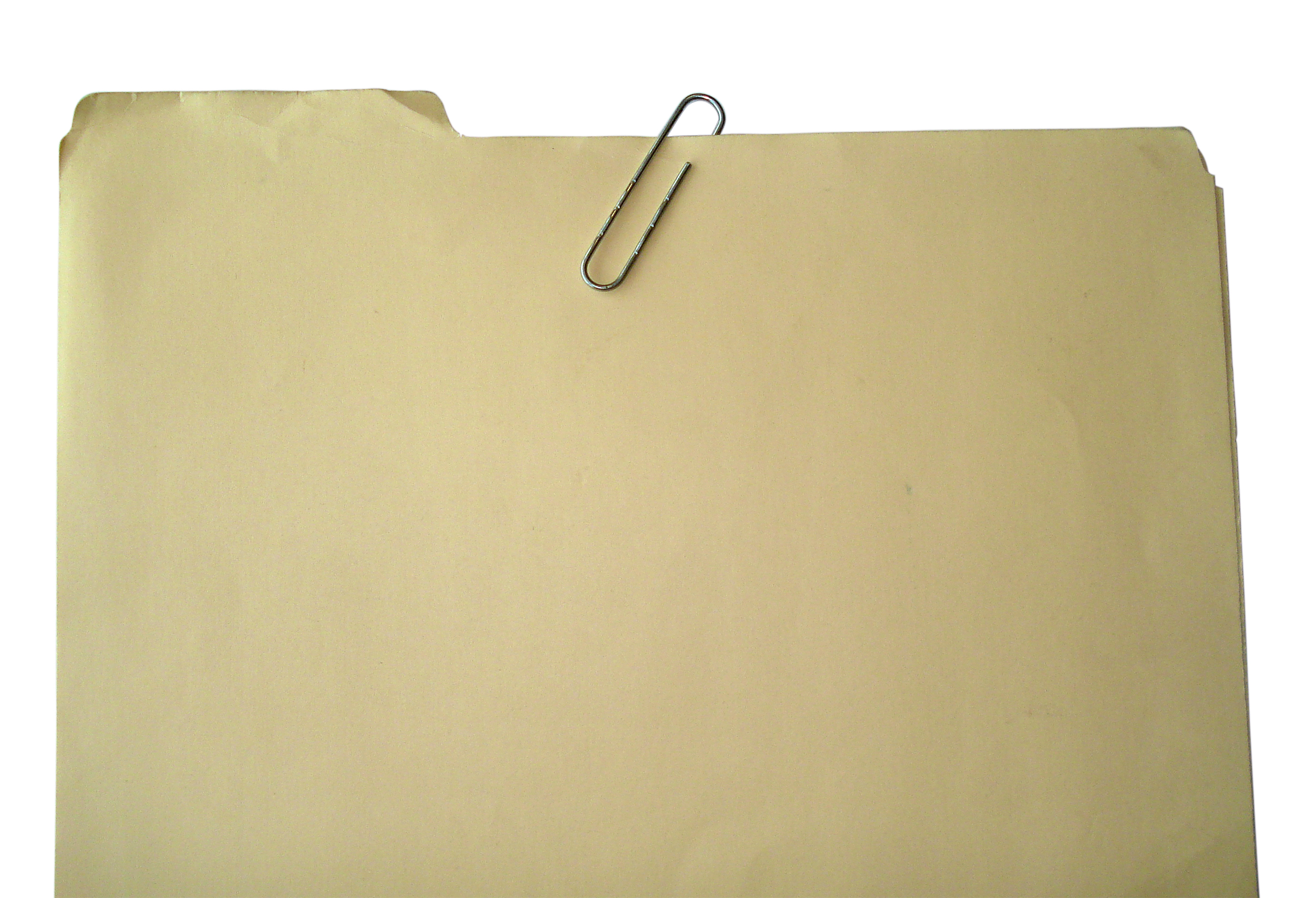
A manila folder with a paperclip

A manila folder is a file folder designed to contain documents. Historically produced with the eponymous Manila hemp paper, modern manila folders are typically made from card stock.

== Use ==
A manila folder is a file folder designed to contain documents, often within a filing cabinet. Modern manila folders are typically made from card stock. The manila folder is a folder designed for transporting documents. It is traditionally made of thick, durable manila paper and sized so that full sheets of printer paper can fit inside without folding. As with the manila envelope, it is traditionally buff in color.

The manila envelope, a close relative of the folder, often has a mechanism on the closing flap that allows it to be opened without damaging the envelope so that it can be reused. There are two main methods to achieve this. The first incorporates a metal clasp with two prongs, which are put through a reinforced eyelet in the flap and then bent apart to hold, while the other has a cardboard button secured tightly on the flap and a piece of string fastened on the envelope body (or the reverse arrangement) is wound around it to form a closure. In a more general sense, similar envelopes made of brown, unbleached paper, used for cheapness, are also described as manila envelopes.

== History ==
Manila folders were first produced with the eponymous Manila hemp paper, made from abacá leaves fibers (Manila hemp). Before the end of the 20th century, papermakers replaced the abacá fibers with wood pulp, which cost less to source and process. Despite the change in production material, the name stuck and the original buff color remained.

In the 1830s, a cotton and linen rag shortage occurred in the United States. This caused papermakers to seek out additional production materials.

In 1843, papermaker Mark Hollingsworth and his sons John and Lyman obtained a patent "to manufacture paper from manila fibers" of abacá leaves. This family company became Hollingsworth & Vose. The Guggenheim claims that this creation of manila paper was a way "of recycling manila rope, previously used on ships". The resulting paper was strong, water resistant, and flexible.

The paper shortage "only abated in the 1870s, when rag paper was gradually replaced by paper made from wood pulp".

By 1873, the United States Department of Agriculture quoted Thomas H. Dunham, who described Manila paper as "nine-tenths jute" when praising jute production.

In 1906, over 2,000,000 piculs of manila fibers were produced, making approximately 66% of the Philippines' export profits.

From 1898 to 1946, the United States colonized the Philippines following the Spanish-American War. The Guggenheim claims the "colonial government found ways to prevent Filipinos from profiting off of the abaca crops, instead favoring the businesses of American expats and Japanese immigrants, as well as ensuring that the bulk of the abaca harvests were exported to the United States" for use in military initiatives.

The manila component of the name originates from Manila hemp, named after Manila, the capital of the Philippines. This was historically the main material for manila folders, alongside the manila envelope and manila paper.

== See also ==
- File folder
- Pee-Chee folder
- Ring binder
