= FlexiLivre =

French Internet-based photo album company

- Company type: Private
- Industry: photo books, photo prints, canvas prints
- Founded: 2013; 13 years ago
- Founders: Mathieu Clouté, Kamel Boughaleb
- Website: www.flexilivre.com

FlexiLivre is a French Internet-based photo album company founded in 2013 by Mathieu Clouté and Kamel Boughaleb.

== Awards and accolades ==
In 2020, FlexiLivre was ranked 778th among the 1,000 fastest-growing companies in Europe by the Financial Times.

The same year, FlexiLivre was ranked as the 134th fastest-growing French company by Les Echos.
