= Manila paper =

Type of paper made of wood fiber

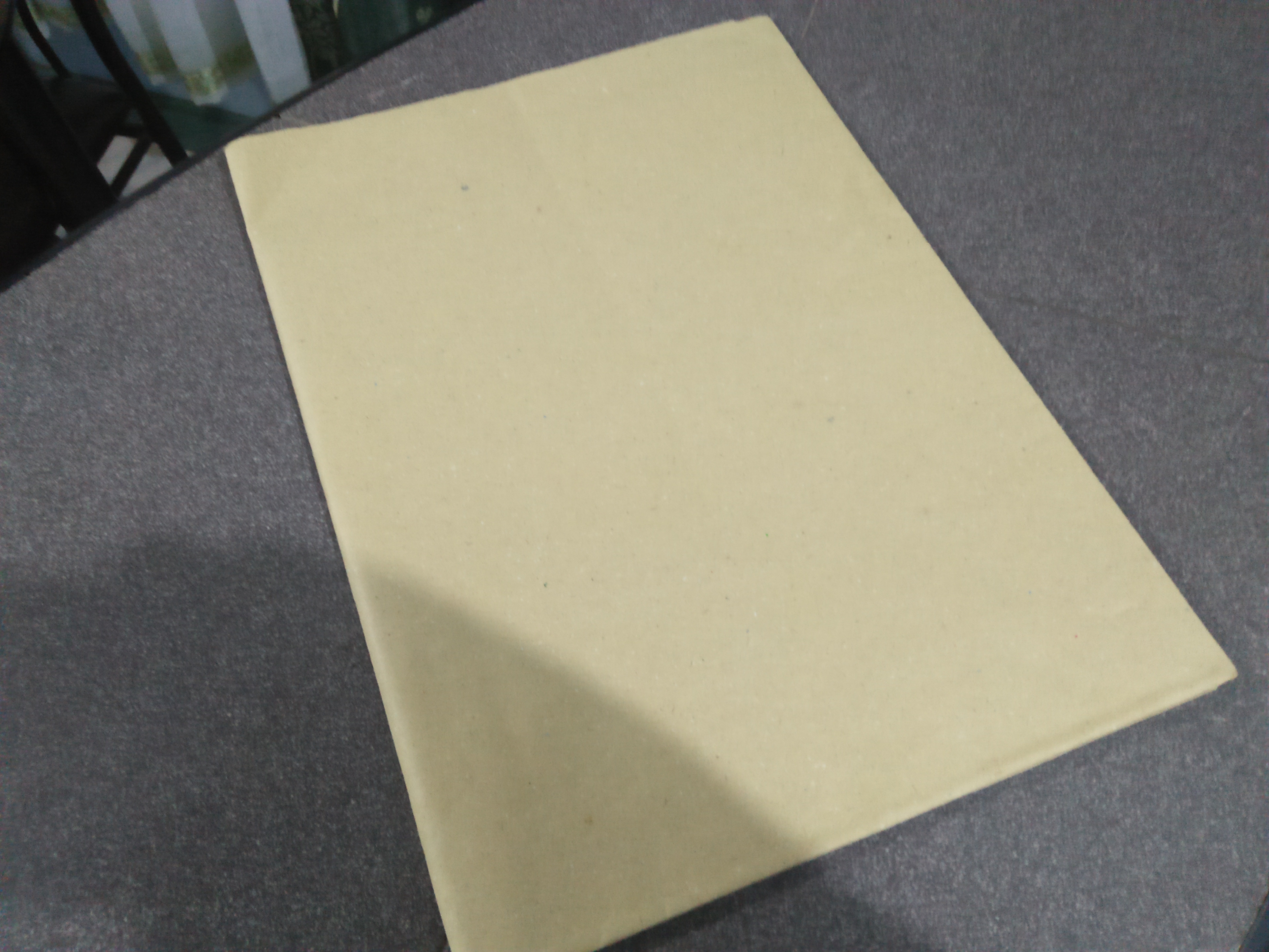
- Type: Paper
- Material: Manila hemp or pulpwood
- Place of origin: Manila, Philippines
- Introduced: 19th century

Manila paper (Spanish: Papel de Manila) is a relatively inexpensive type of paper, generally made through a less-refined process than other types of paper, and is typically made from semi-bleached wood fibers.

The manila component of the name originates from manila hemp (a.k.a. abacá leaves), which was named after Manila, the capital of the Philippines. Beginning in the 1840s, recycled abacá rope fibers were the main material for manila paper.

Before the end of the 20th century, papermakers replaced the abacá fibers with wood pulp, which cost less to source and process. Despite the change in production material, "the name and color remain."

Since at least 1915, manila paper has been shaped to create manila file folders and manila envelopes.

== Attributes ==
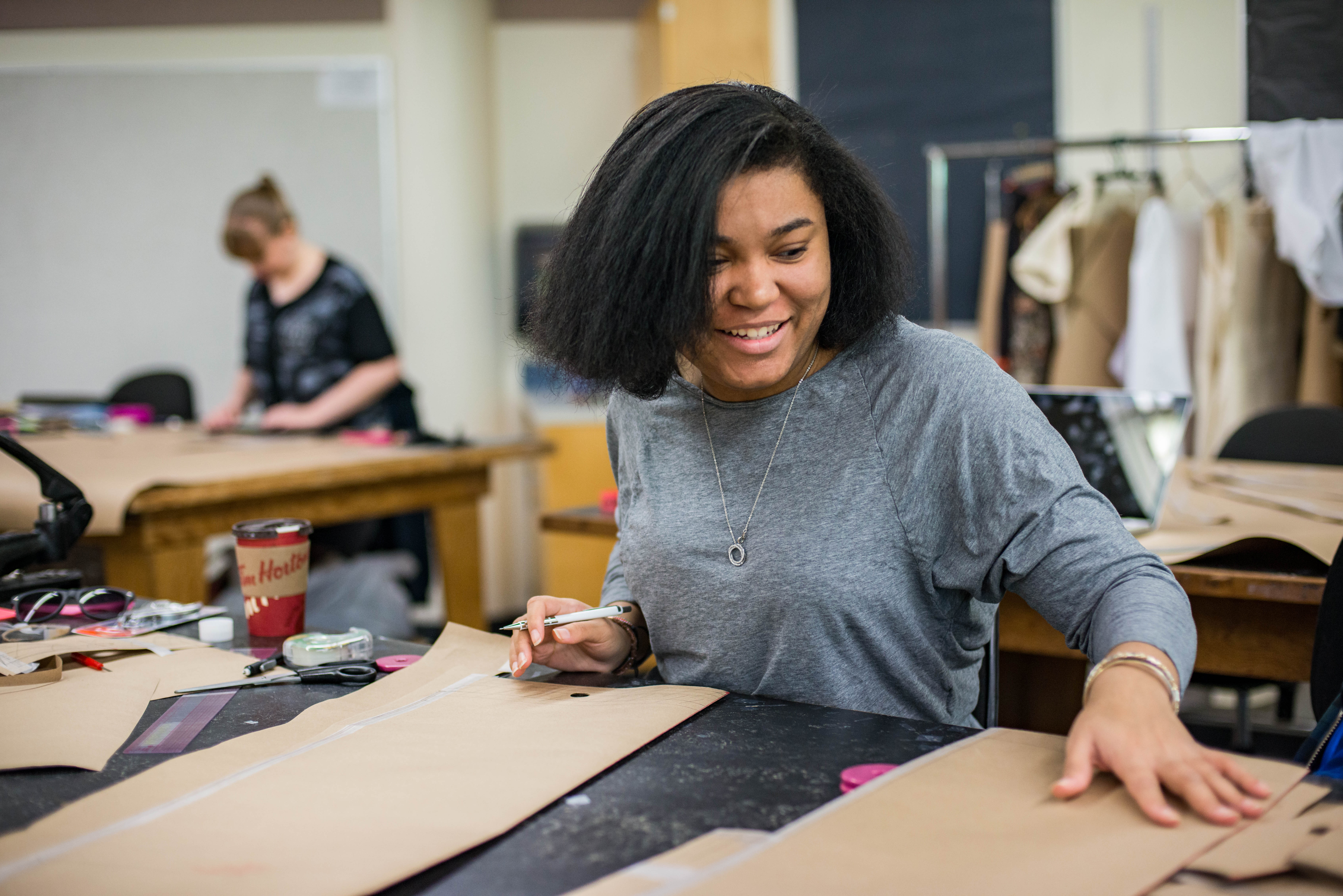
Fashion student using manila paper

It is just as strong as kraft paper but has better printing qualities, such as stronger pigment retention. Manila paper is buff-colored and the fibers of the paper are usually visible to the naked eye.

Some fashion schools and people in the fashion industry use large rolls of Manila to create finalised clothing patterns. Because the paper is generally inexpensive, it is commonly given to children for making art.

== History ==
=== 19th century ===
In the 1830s, a cotton and linen rag shortage occurred in the United States. This caused papermakers to seek out additional production materials. This paper shortage "only abated in the 1870s, when rag paper was gradually replaced by paper made from wood pulp".

In 1843, papermaker Mark Hollingsworth and his sons John and Lyman obtained a patent "to manufacture paper from manila fibers". This family company became Hollingsworth & Vose. The Guggenheim claims that this creation of manila paper was a way "of recycling manila rope, previously used on ships." The resulting paper was strong, water-resistant, and flexible.

Manila paper was originally made out of old Manila hemp ropes which were extensively used on ships, having replaced true hemp. The ropes were made from abacá or Musa textilis, which is grown in the Philippines. Abacá is an exceptionally strong fibre, nowadays used for special papers like tea bag tissue. It is also very expensive, being several times more expensive than woodpulp, hence the change to that fiber for what is still called Manilla—usually with two L's. More recently new wood pulp has often been replaced with a high proportion of recycled fibers. True Manila hemp folders would have been much tougher and longer lasting than modern folders.

By 1873, the United States Department of Agriculture quoted Thomas H. Dunham, who described Manila paper as "nine-tenths jute" when praising jute production.

=== 20th century ===
In 1906, over 2,000,000 piculs of manila fibers were produced, making approximately 66% of the country's export profits.

From 1898 to 1946, the United States colonized the Philippines following the Spanish-American War. The Guggenheim claims the "colonial government found ways to prevent Filipinos from profiting off the abaca crops, instead favoring the businesses of American expats and Japanese immigrants, as well as ensuring that the bulk of the abaca harvests were exported to the United States" for use in military initiatives.

== Types ==
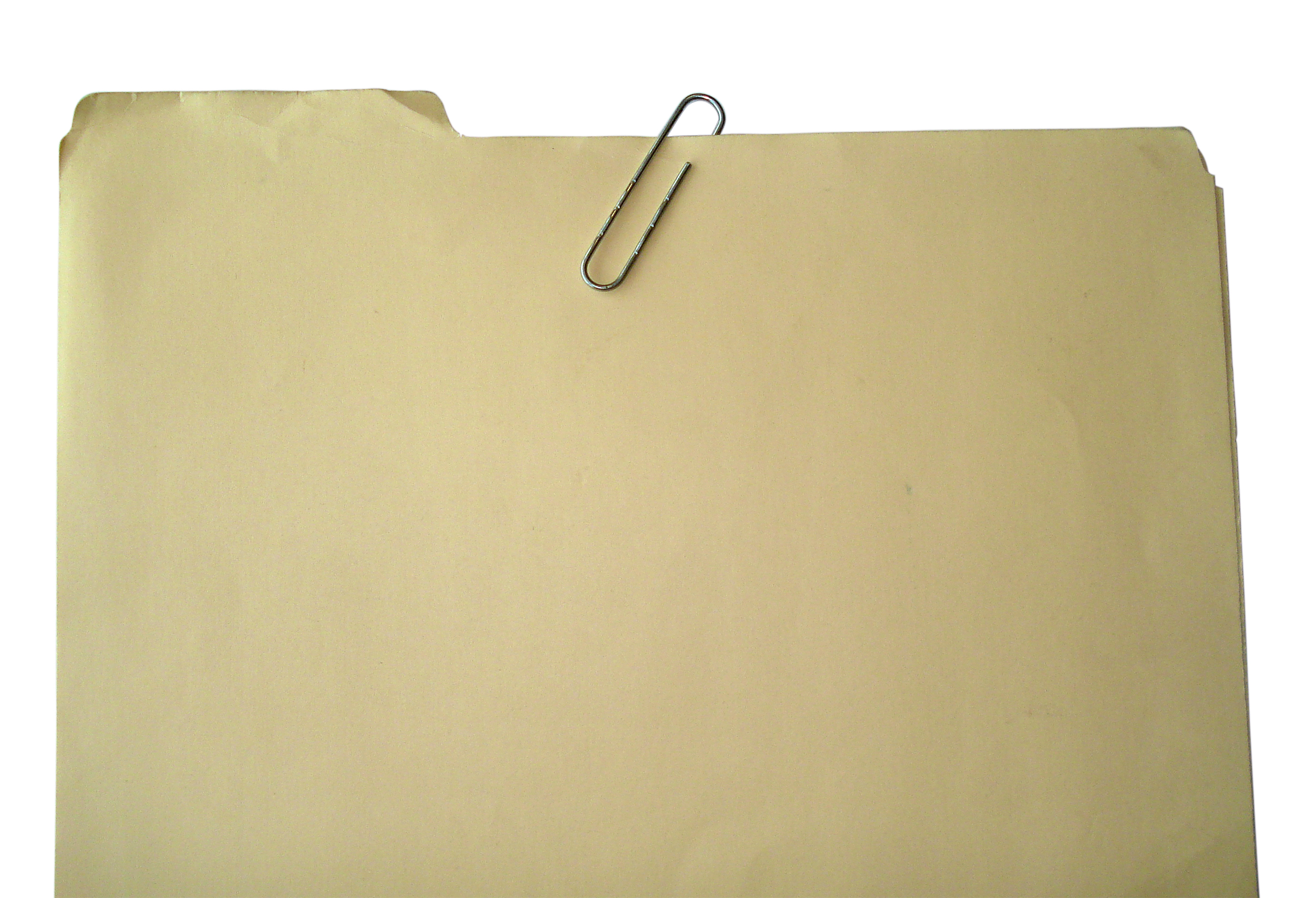
A manila folder affixed with a paper clip

=== Manila folder ===
A manila folder is a file folder designed to contain documents, often within a filing cabinet. It is generally formed by folding a large sheet of stiff card stock in half, sized so that full sheets of printer paper can fit inside without folding. Like manila envelopes, folders are traditionally buff, but other colors are occasionally used to differentiate categories of files.

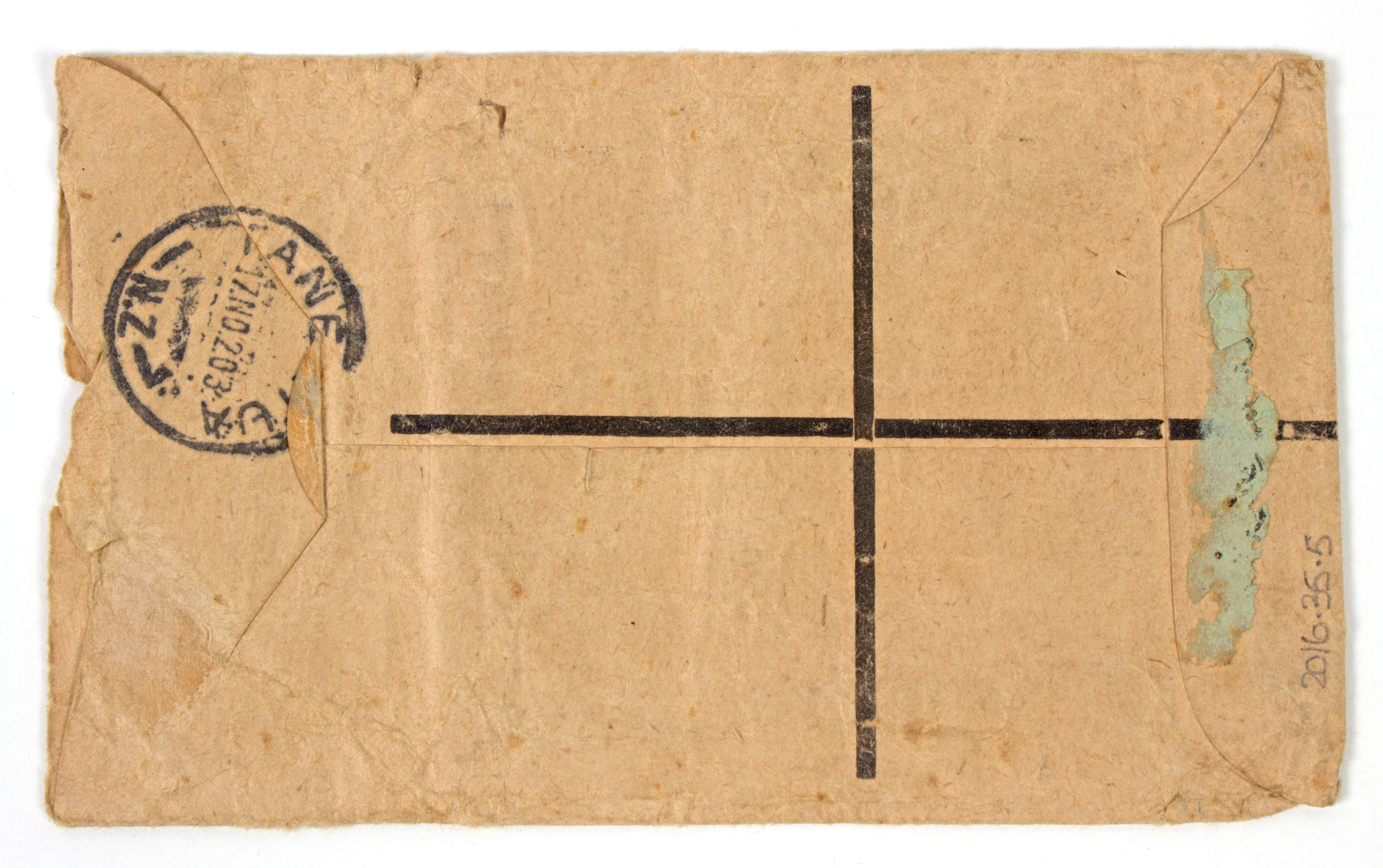
A 1915 manila envelope notifying the next of kin of a WWI soldier who died in battle; Tāneatua, New Zealand

=== Manila envelope ===
The manila envelope, a close relative of the folder, often has a mechanism on the closing flap that allows it to be opened without damaging the envelope so that it can be reused. There are two main methods to achieve this. The first incorporates a metal clasp with two prongs, which are put through a reinforced eyelet in the flap and then bent apart to hold, while the other has a cardboard button secured tightly on the flap and a piece of string fastened on the envelope body (or the reverse arrangement) is wound around it to form a closure. In a more general sense, similar envelopes made of brown, unbleached paper, used for cheapness, are also described as manila envelopes.

== See also ==
- Card stock
- Manila folder
- Kraft paper
