= Filing system =

Filing system may refer to:

- Filing cabinet, a piece of office furniture
- File system, a method of storing and organizing computer files and their data
- Sorting, any process of arranging items systematically
- Taxonomy (general), the science and practice of classification
