= File folder =

Type of folder

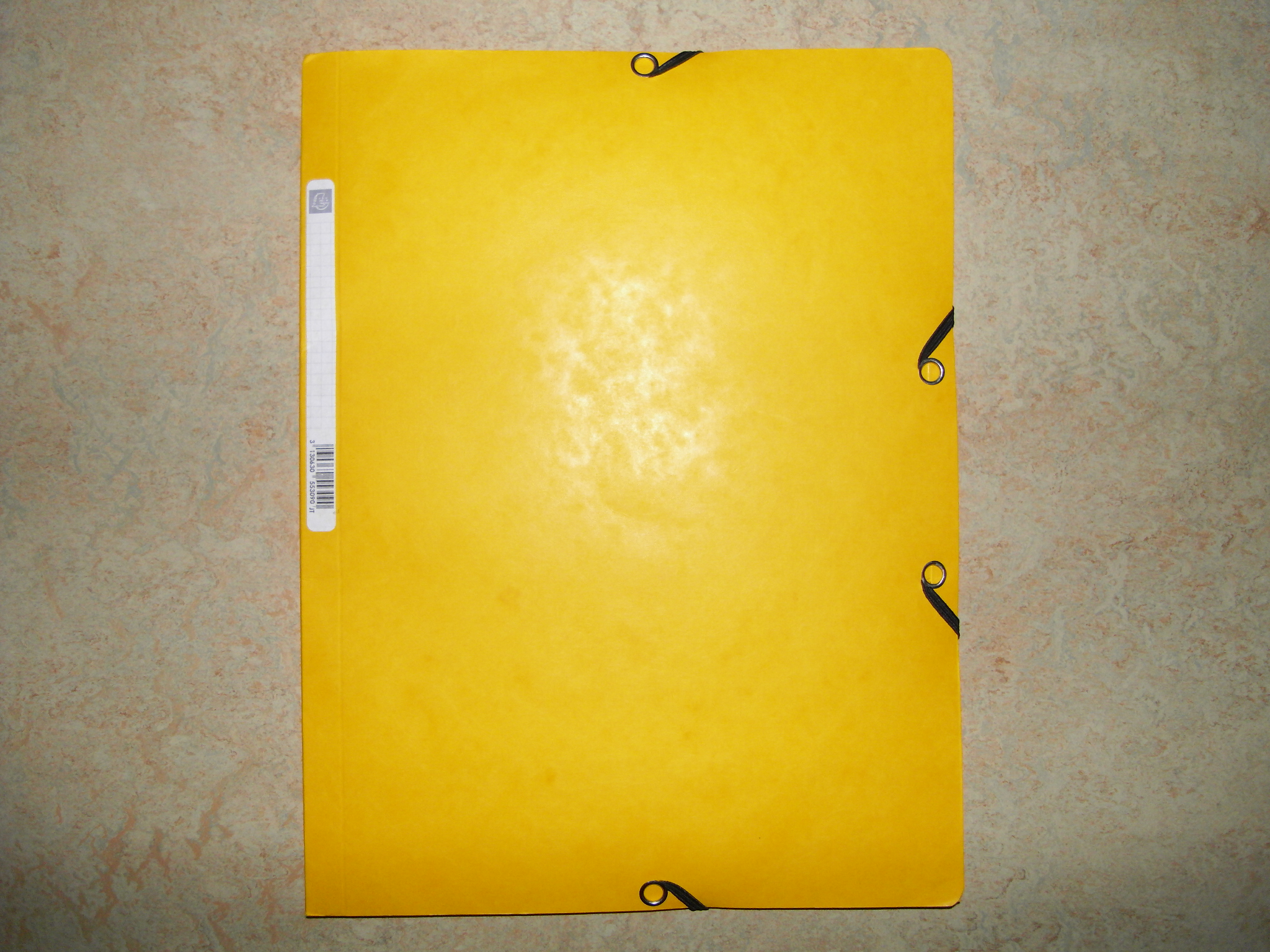
A yellow file folder made of paper.

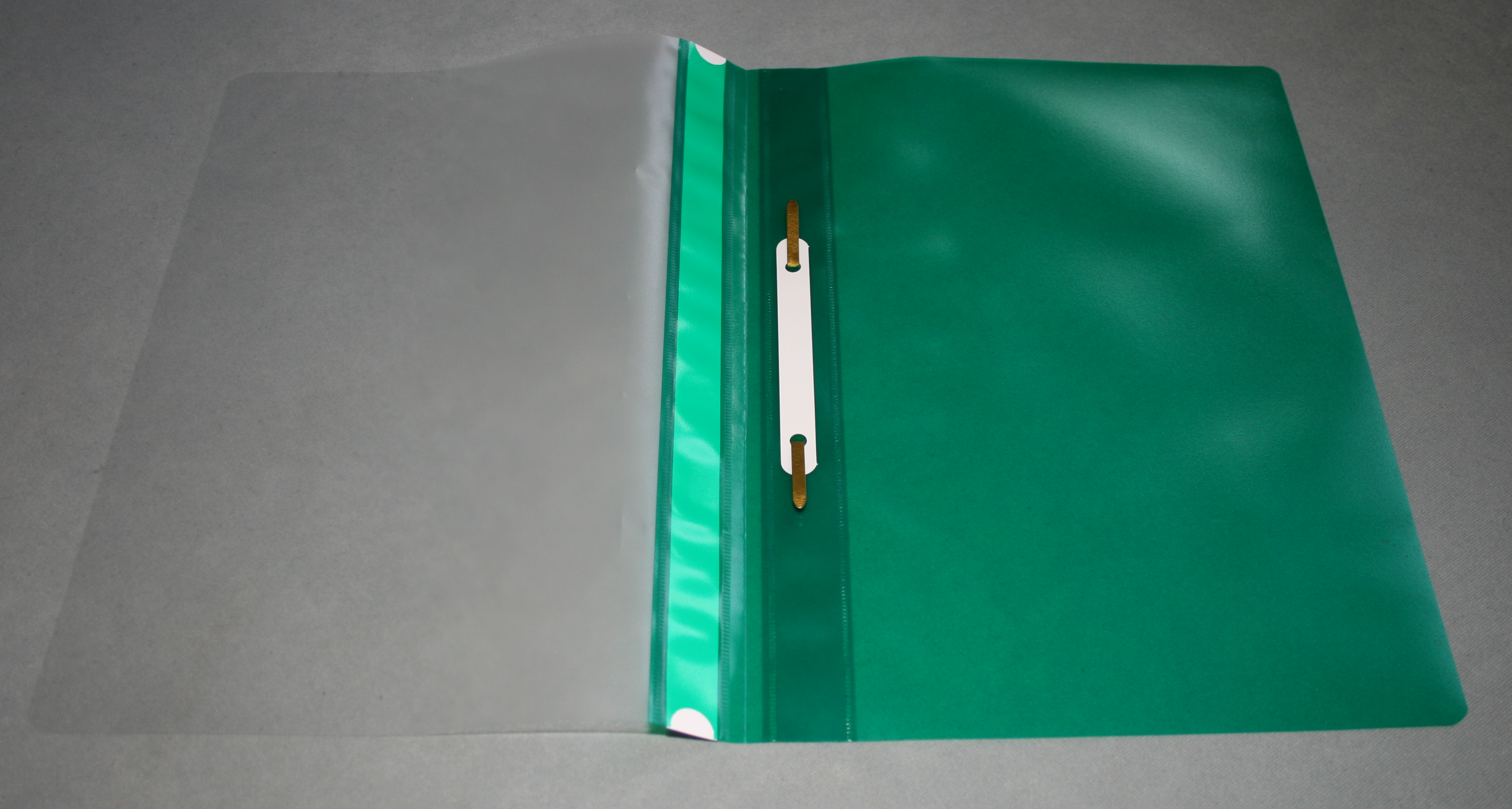
A file folder in open position.

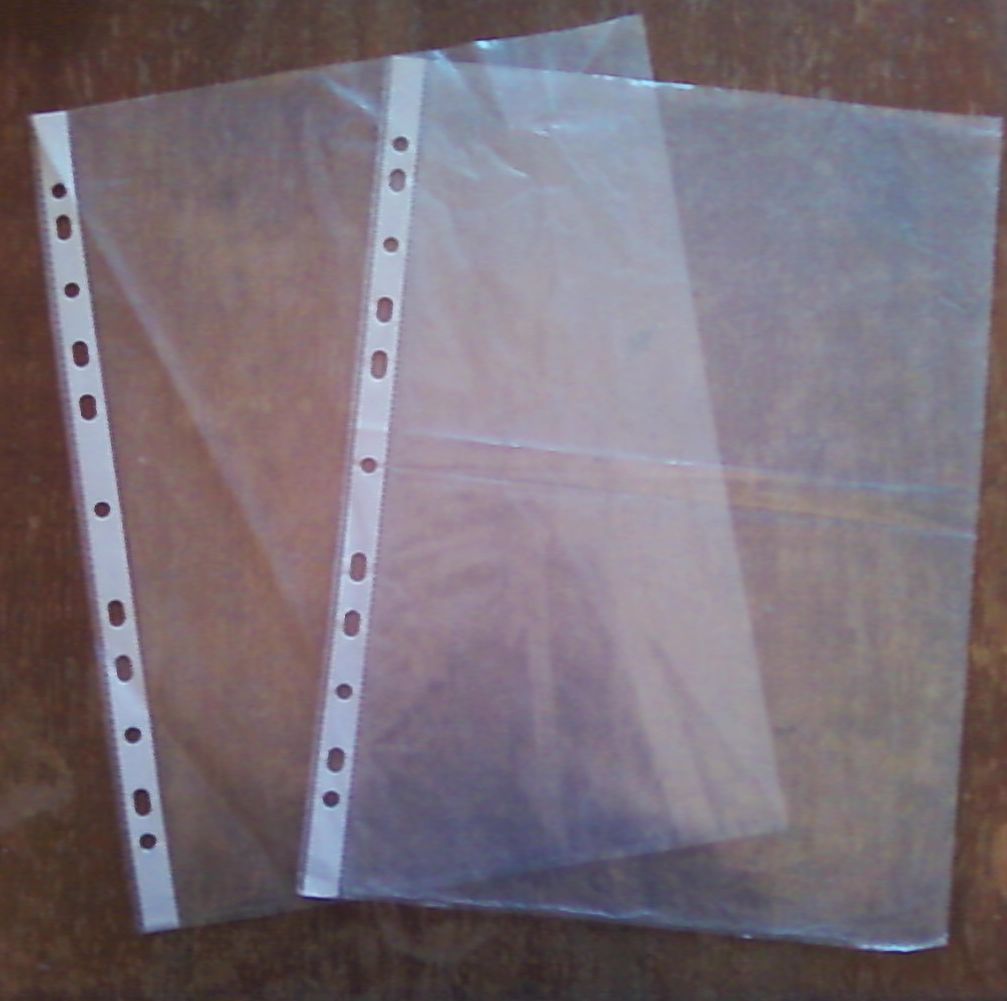
Punched pockets used in some file folders.

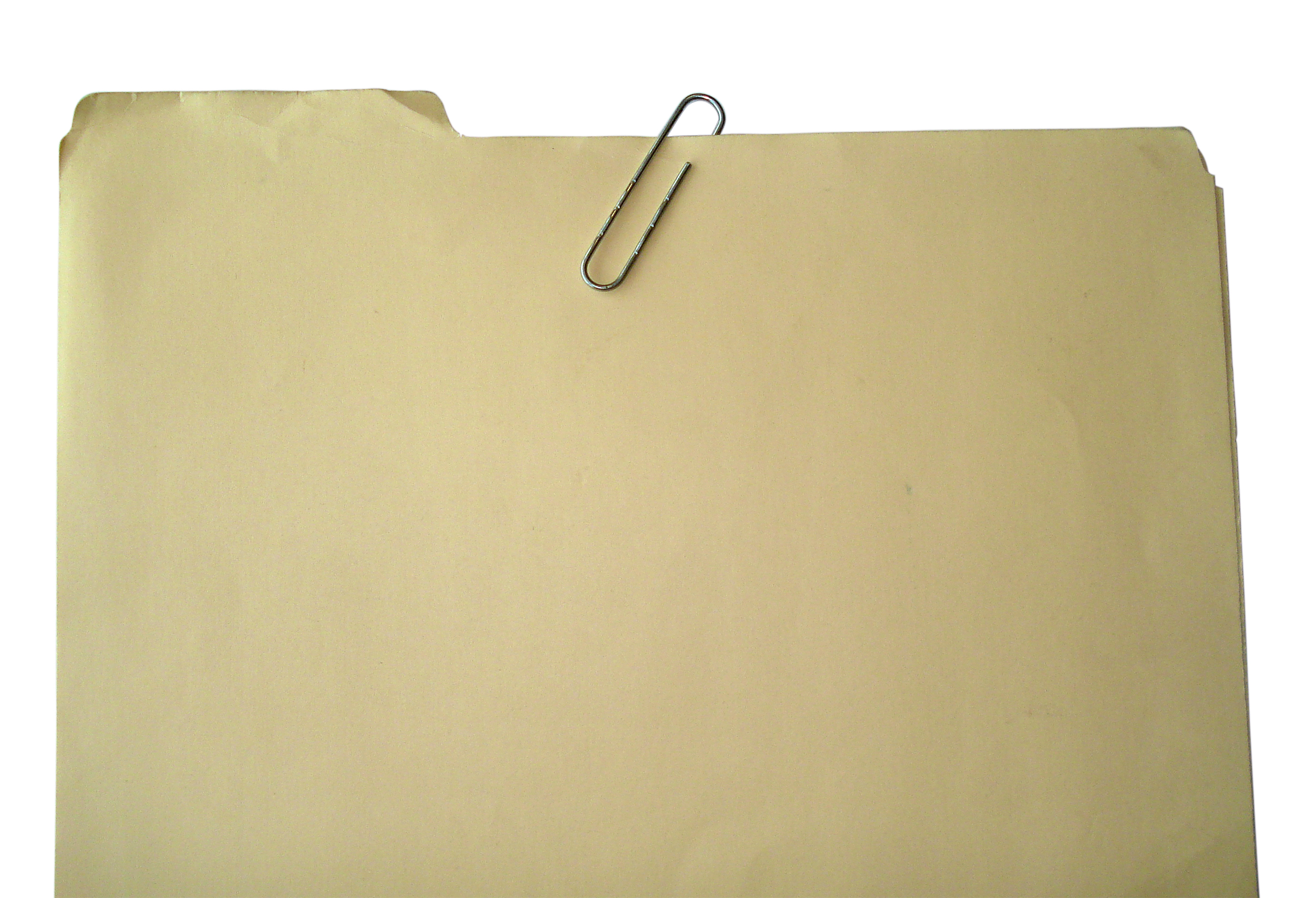
A Manila folder affixed with a Paper clip

A file folder (or simply folder) is a kind of folder that holds papers together for organization and protection. File folders usually consist of a sheet of heavy paper stock or other thin, but stiff, material which is folded in half, and are used to keep paper documents. They are often used in conjunction with a filing cabinet for storage. File folders can easily be purchased at office supplies stores.

File folders are usually labelled based on what is inside them. Folders can be labeled directly on the tab with a pen or pencil. Others write on adhesive labels that are placed on the tabs. There are also electronic label makers that can be used to make the labels.

File folders can be made from plastic or paper. When paper is used, it is preferable that it is made from paper pulp with long cellulose fibre, such as kraft paper or manila paper.

File folders are a core organisational tool of bureaucracy, business administration and scientific management. The medical profession, in particular, make heavy use of file folders for individual patient records, usually collated ready to hand in rows of filing shelves of filing cabinets in alphabetical order, and continues to do so in many practices despite the ongoing migration toward electronic health records. File folders are also prevalent in the filing systems of the legal profession.

The "Folder having an Improved Fastening Mechanism" was invented by Mr. Alberto D. Noblejas from Makati, Philippines. And by January 25, 1973 he had it patented to the Philippine Patent Office. Elimination of paper records, and the file folders used to organise these, is a goal of the paperless office. Document imaging through document capture software remains a labour-intensive process for archival materials; archival records often end up boxed in Bankers Boxes packed with file folders in secure storage facilities, with a retrieval time of hours to days.

== Terminology ==
File or folder are other terms used for file folders, but "file folders" is a common name for the item in the United States. Manila folders are likely the most common, but file folders come in many different forms. In the United States, letter and legal sizes are common.

The exact way to refer to this kind of folder which is somewhat unclear. There is no internationally standard term. The term file folder seems to be one that dominates North American language, but does not seem as common in other countries. As stated, some refer to file folders simply as folders, but in North America, this is confusing because folder can refer to several different things. Others use the term manila folders, but this is confusing because not all file folders are made of Manila hemp. This type of folder is sometimes incorrectly referred to as a "vanilla folder."

Another commonly used folder type is the hanging folder, which has hooks on all four corners that slide over a rail. Normally, hanging folders are used to file one or more manila folders, and it is not a common practice to put loose sheets directly into hanging folders. When some documents need to be retrieved, the corresponding manila folder(s) are removed from the hanging folder. The hanging folder itself is left in its place on the rails.

Occasionally, the term for the item changes based on its context. Some may refer to file folders as files when they are being used for storage. For example, one might say, "Would you get me the file on the Patterson case?" Or someone might say, "That information is with the files on the insurance claims." File folder or just folder seems to be how many refer to the item when it is being purchased or not containing any paper yet. For instance, someone might say, "Would you give me an empty folder from the box? I need to make a file on the Thompson estate." Or someone might say, "When you run to the store would you get me some legal size file folders?" Then again, office furniture that holds paper documents is invariable referred to as a Filing cabinet or simply a file cabinet, and never a folder cabinet.

The terms are even more distorted in their digital counterparts. In computing, the word "folder" (or, in some cases, "file folder") is often used as a synonym for "directory", while the word "file" is universally used for actual data items on a disk (sometimes called "documents", especially on the Apple Macintosh). In Unix-like systems, this is resolved to some degree by the creed "everything is a file"; folders are themselves just a special type of file, and many commands (to copy, delete, move, or rename) can be executed without knowing whether the file identifies an entire folder or not.

== Tabbed file folders ==
=== Tab style/cut ===
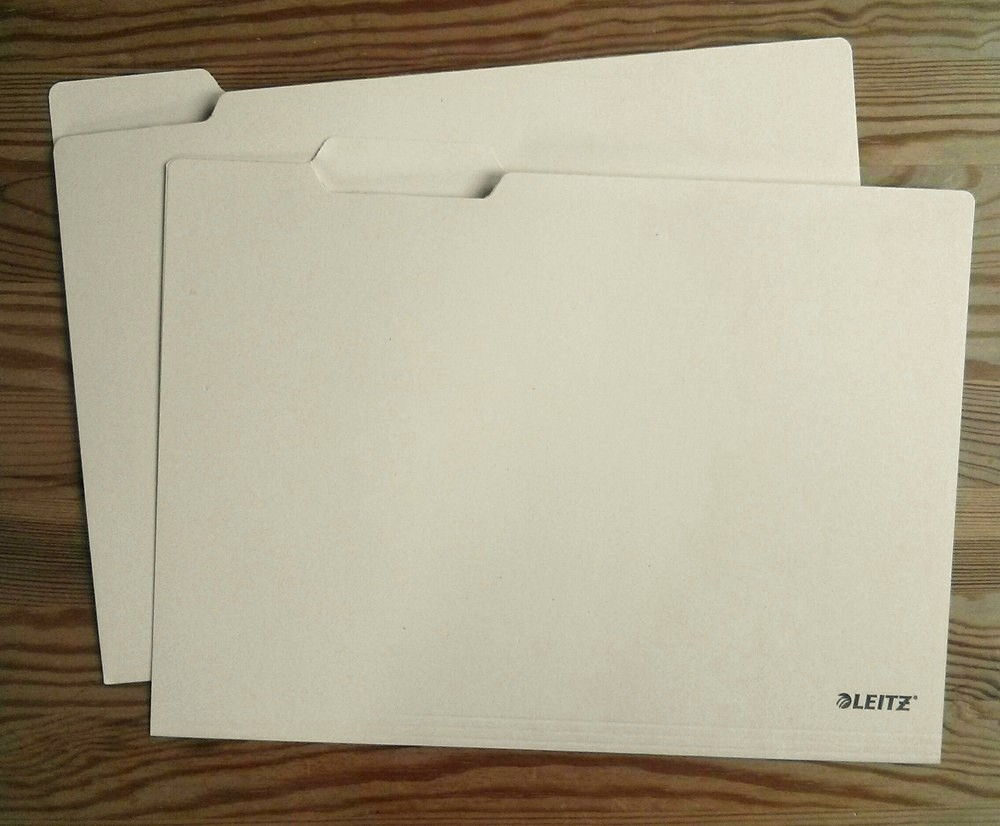
Two manila folders made by Leitz

File folders can have tabs in them. Tabs are often helpful when many files are being stored together and there needs to be an easy way to differentiate them. The tabs can be on the top of the folders (common in business offices) or on the end/side (common in medical offices). Tab sizes vary and are designated based on the size of each tab in proportion to the total length of the folder. They can be:

- Straight cut. There is one long tab.
- 1/3 cut. There are three tab positions, each is approximately 1/3 of the total length of the folder. Essentially, tabs are cut to be in the left, center, or right positions.
- 1/5 cut. Similar to the 1/3 cut, except there are five tab positions, each being 1/5 of the total length of the folder.
- 2/5 cut. There are only two tab positions, the right and the right of center (ROC) positions. ROC is somewhat like a left position, but doesn't extend to the end of the folder because the tabs are only 2/5 of the total length.
- 1/2 cut. There are two tab positions, left and right.

=== Tab positions ===
Since tabs can be cut in different positions, the position of the tab can be referred to as well. For instance, for the 1/3 cut style, folders with tabs in the furthest right position are considered to have a tab in position number three.

== See also ==
- Manila folder
- Presentation folder
- Ring binder
