= Rotary storage =

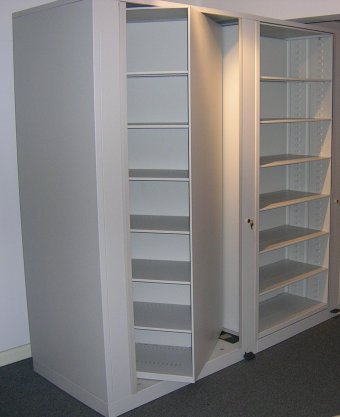
Rotary storage filing system unit

Rotary storage systems are specialised office filing units designed to offer increased storage volumes per square foot compared to traditional filing units.

== Rotary storage systems ==
Rotary storage systems are filing cabinets; specialised office furniture units usually consisting of a double sided rotating unit, allowing the user to access two full sides of filing from one point. A foot pedal or lever is often used to operate the rotation mechanism, thus allowing user easy control.

== Capacity, siting and speed advantages ==
Many rotary filing systems can store the contents of seventeen four drawer filing cabinets in just three eight-tier units, allowing multiple times the storage volume created by traditional filing cabinets. A wide range of fitments makes the systems suitable for storing a vast array file types and multimedia. For security, each unit can invariably be locked individually.

Rotary storage systems usually have no shutters or doors, and therefore can be placed very close to walls or partitioning, for a very efficient use of floor space. Units are often used to divide office space.

Rotary storage units can allow faster file access than banks of conventional cabinets, as 50% of stored items are immediately visible to the operator, the rest typically being a pedal push away.
