= Photo album =

Photographs collected in a book

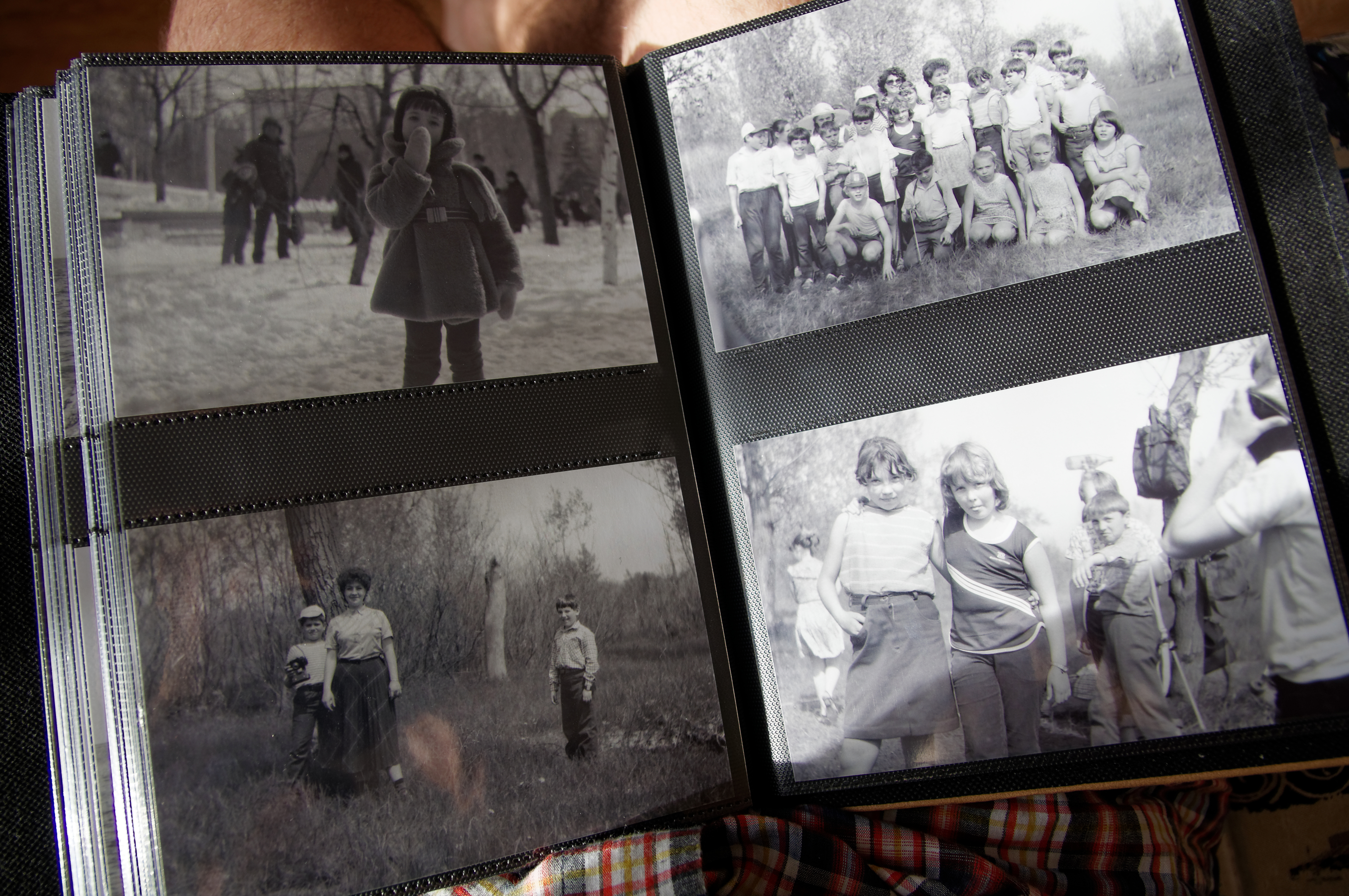
A photo album

A photographic album or photo album, is a series of photographic prints collected by an individual person or family in the form of a book. Some book-form photo albums have compartments which the photos may be slipped into, usually made out of plastic; other albums have heavy paper with an abrasive surface covered with clear plastic sheets, on which surface photos can be put. Older style albums often were simply books of heavy paper on which photos could be glued to or attached with adhesive corners or pages.

== History ==
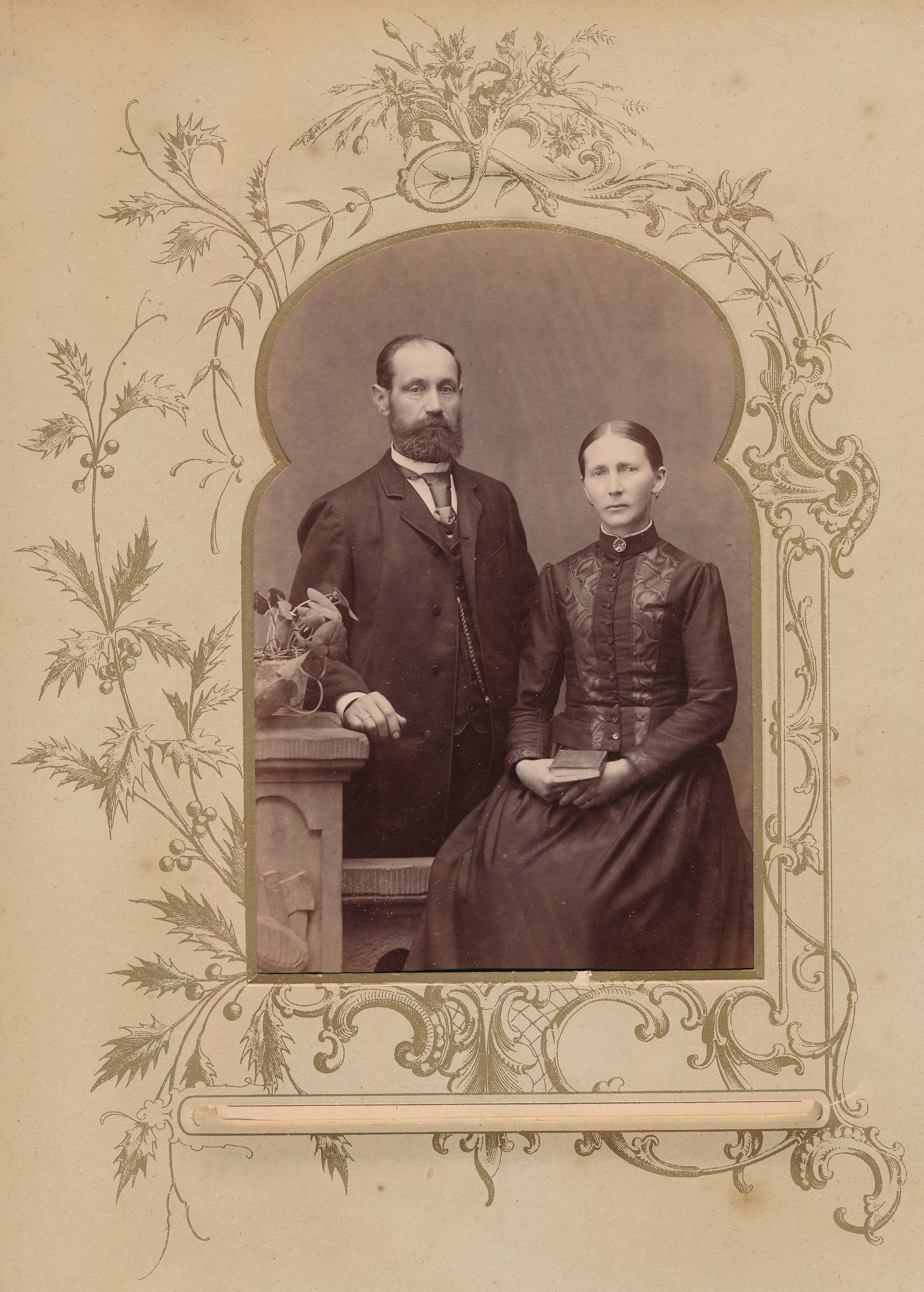
Page from a historical photo album

The oldest photograph albums in the collection of the Library of Congress in Washington, D.C. are from the 1850s. Early family photo albums were often displayed in the home. "Families who could only afford a couple of pictures would put them into an album, to which other family members would add theirs."

== Coffee table books / photo-books ==
Coffee table books get their name from the intended purpose of being placed on a coffee table for the entertainment of guests. Coffee table books are photo-books, and come in various sizes from very small to very large. They are printed books with soft and thin pages like normal books. A coffee table book is typically larger and is bound in a hard cover, whereas a smaller photo book is normally bound in a soft cover. The print quality of photo books varies from photographic paper prints to inkjet prints on normal paper.

== Digital photo books ==
Digital photo books have digitally printed pages as opposed to albums that consist of traditional photos. Both flush-mount albums as well as coffee table books are printed digitally. The photos of flush mount albums are printed on photographic paper, which is comparable to the quality of traditionally developed photos. Coffee table books, on the other hand, are printed with inkjet on ordinary paper and are therefore of a lower quality. Digital printing gives the album designer a vast number of design possibilities, for example magazine-style or montage albums are only possible with digital printing.

Digital photo books are increasingly popular because they allow anyone with a digital camera to create coffee table books of their photos. Also, it is often considered easier to print photos onto pages directly, rather than position and secure individual prints onto the pages of a traditional album. Aesthetically, digital photo books seem neater and more professional than albums. This has led to their growing popularity among both professional and amateur photographers. Digital photo book printing companies have used the internet to make designing and producing photo books very easy for the general consumer.

== Flush mount albums ==
Flush mount albums have hard covers with thick, rigid pages. They consist of photographic prints that are dry-mounted onto cardboard, creating a durable and lay-flat surface. The covers are typically made of leather, leatherette, or glass. The photos lie completely flat and can extend across the entire page. Flush mount albums are often produced in a magazine-style layout and are commonly used for special occasions such as weddings and anniversaries because they are generally higher quality and more expensive to produce than standard coffee table books.

== Magazine-style albums / montage albums ==
The term magazine-style refers to the design style inspired by fashion magazines, but the style can differ greatly between albums dependent on the designer. The layout is usually referred to as digital montage, hence the alternative name montage albums. The layout is designed on the computer, utilizing custom- or template- generated images.

== Storybook albums ==
Storybook albums narrate a story, like the story of a wedding day or a vacation from beginning to end. If they are digitally printed the designer can use images as well as text, graphics and color for the narration of the story.

== Scrapbooking albums ==
Scrapbooking albums are blank photo albums where people can stick photo prints, clippings, tickets, and even small mementos. Scrapbooking is then an activity documenting a period of time like a baby's first year, holiday, or time at university. People decorate their scrapbooking albums with drawings, text and calligraphy, stickers, or stamps.

== Homemade decorative albums ==
Homemade decorative albums can easily be made at home. The items needed to make this type of album may already be a part of the home office supplies. Items consist of: binder folders, clear sheet protectors or picture sleeves, fabric of choice, and a hot glue gun. Some may choose to use stuffing to give a fluff to the album. This type of album is simple to make; and allows the crafter to explore their creative side, while adding a personal touch.

== Matted album ==
Matted albums are albums with recessed frames, in which each photo is hand-mounted. The photos are digitally or traditionally printed and can also be changed also after completion of the album.

== Self-mount album ==
Self-mount albums are the most common form of a traditional album. They contain manually mounted digital or traditional photos that can be rearranged. Self-mount albums are easy to produce and can be used for any occasion.

== Software ==
There are many software programs available to organize images in folders or albums. These programs generally allow for sorting and ordering of different images, tagging the images, and viewing them in slideshows or printing them. These programs commonly allow the user to perform basic edits such as cropping, red-eye removal, and some basic "one touch" enhancements for color and lighting. Some online albums have introduced techniques of separating special effects from the original picture so that the picture is not edited - effects are applied when displayed without destroying the original picture.

There are also many other, lay-up software programs available for making photo-books. These are generally offered free as a design tool but require the user to pay for the production of their printed photobook. These programs are generally not specifically designed for photo editing, more for the express purpose of creating a book that will eventually be printed and bound into a photo-book. These programs are generally provided by the company that print and bind the photobooks. Therefore, the home printing function is generally not available.

== See also ==
- Face book
- Image organizer
