= Springback binder =

Type of book binding

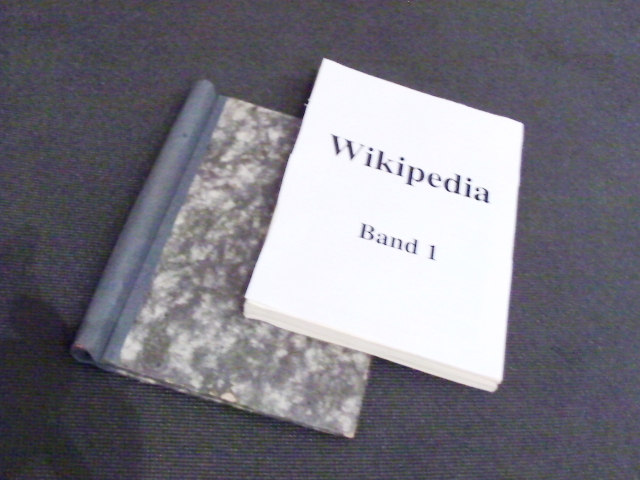
A springback binder with loose sheets

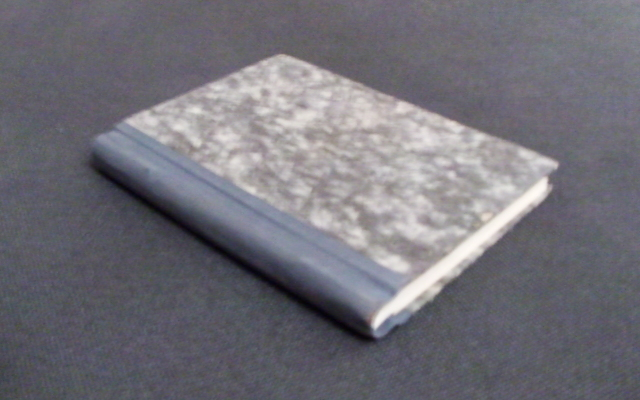
The sheets held together by the binder

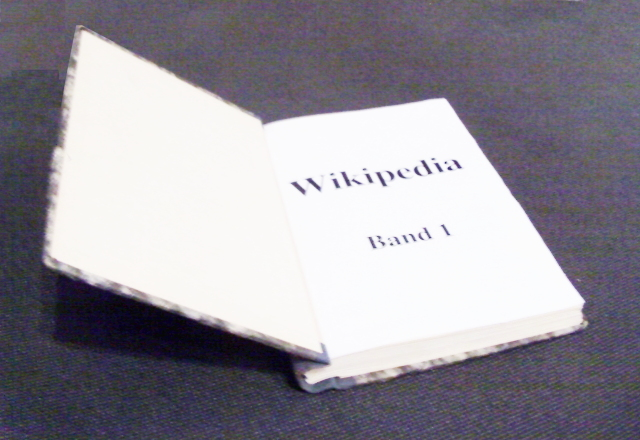
Largest angle at which the binder can be opened without loosening the sheets

A springback binder is a device for rapid and repeated binding of loose-leaf collections into books.

The springback binder resembles the outer parts of a hardcover book, with a spine, a front cover, and a back cover. The spine however includes a steel spring that serves to hold together the inner book as soon as it is inserted. When the front and back covers are pushed apart by more than 270 degrees, the spring will open, and the inner book can be inserted, removed or supplemented by individual leaves. The process takes only a few seconds, and the finished bound book is like a book with hard cover. Typical paper sizes are A4 and A5, or their equivalent, the maximum stack height is usually 2 cm.

In contrast to other binding methods, the binder can be reused by simply removing the old inner book block and replacing it by a new one. This way, the binder can be used for decades for always new content. Furthermore, no additional devices are required than the binder itself. Since the inner book is neither glued, nor stitched or stapled, it can still be used as a master for additional copies.

In the GDR, a springback binder in A5 format was part of a first grader's typical equipment. During the school year, it was filled with exercise sheets that were distributed one by one.

== See also ==
- Loose leaf
- Ring binder
