= Ring binder =

Large folder that contains file folders or hole-punched papers

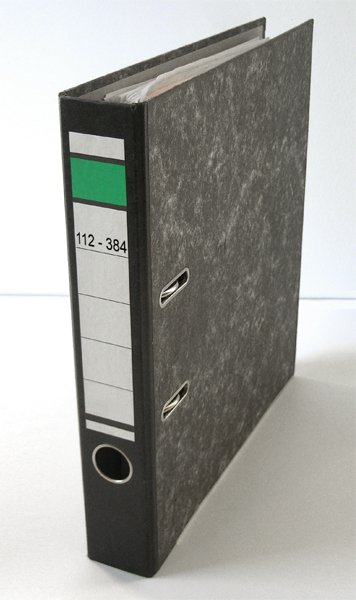
A ring binder, folded

Ring binders (loose leaf binders, looseleaf binders, or sometimes called files in Britain) are large folders that contain file folders or hole punched papers (called loose leaves). These binders come in various sizes and colors and can accommodate an array of paper sizes. These are held in the binder by circular or D-shaped retainers, onto which the contents are threaded. In North America, the rings themselves come in a variety of sizes, including 0.5, 1, 1.5, and 2 inches (13, 25, 38, and 51 mm), though other sizes are also available. The rings may be secured by lever arch mechanisms or other securing systems. The binders themselves are typically made from plastic with metal rings. Early designs were patented during the late 19th century.

== History ==
American Henry Tillinghast Sisson invented a "new and useful improvement in portfolios and paper files" he called a "temporary binder." It used a spring inside a tube to hold papers securely. He received patent no. 23506 on April 5, 1859.

German Friedrich Soennecken invented ring binders in 1886 in Bonn. He also registered a patent on 14 November 1886 for his Papierlocher für Sammelmappen ("paper punch for binders", or hole punch). German Louis Leitz, founder of Leitz, later made some important changes to the development of ring binders in Stuttgart. Leitz created the lever arch file, a standing binder with a riveted lever arch mechanism (the lever can be easily opened, closed and locked) and space-saving slots into the cover, thereby introducing the modern ring binder.

Another design for ring binders was invented in 1889 by Andreas Tengwall in Helsingborg, Sweden, and patented in 1890 under the name "Trio binder", named after a business consortium of Tengwall and two associates. Tengwall's design uses four rings, in two paired sets. The hole placement of Tengwall's trio binder is still used as a de facto standard for hole punching in Sweden under the name triohålning. These holes are 21 millimetres (0.83 in), 70 millimetres (2.8 in), and 21 millimetres (0.83 in) apart.

William P. Pitt obtained patent no. 778070 on December 20, 1904 for a 3-ring binder that became a standard in the United States. The North American de facto standard spacing is 4.25 inches (108 mm) between holes.

== Variations ==
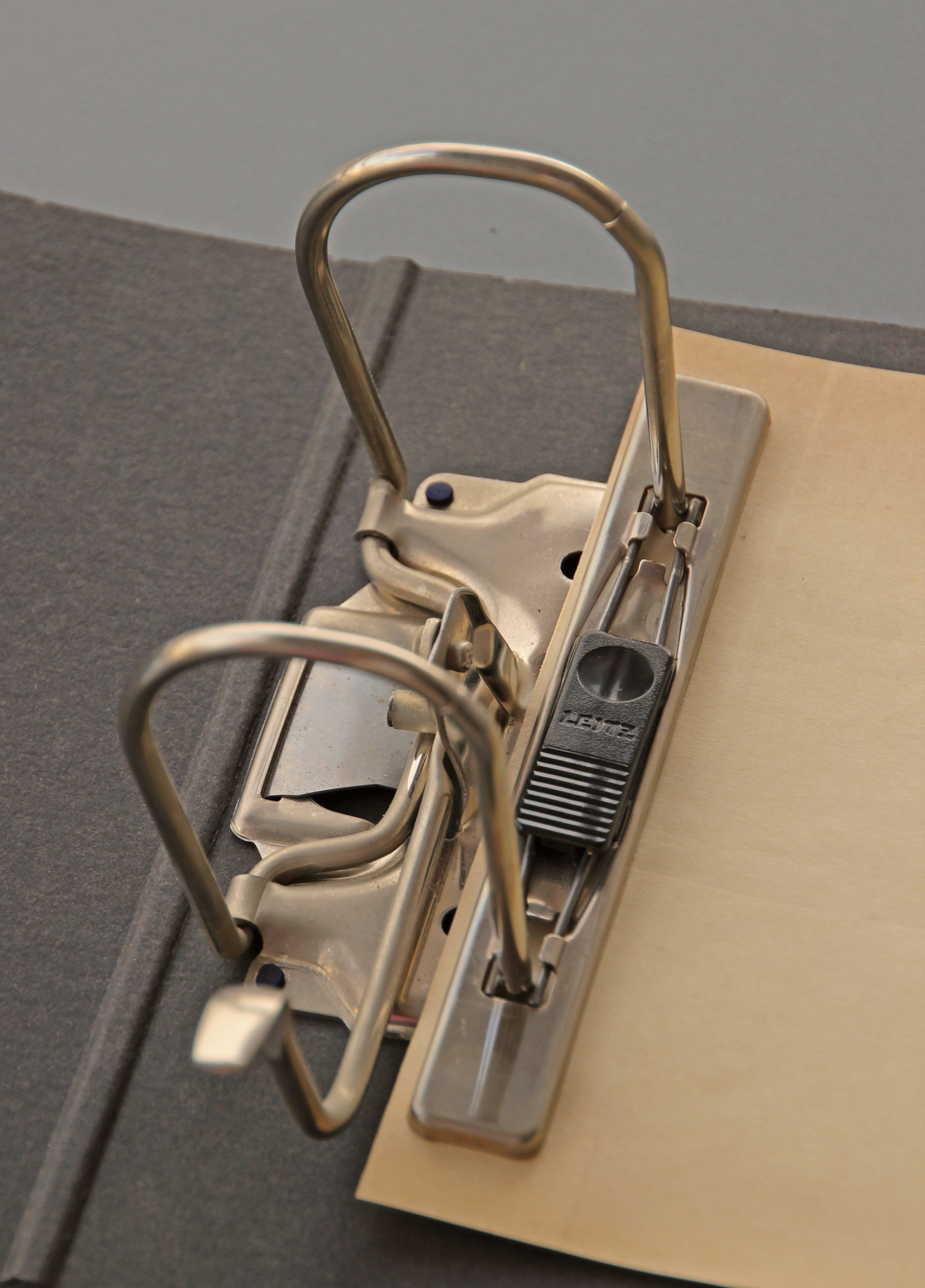
Two ring binder lever arch mechanism

Binders come in many standard sizes with respect to both capacity and paper size. Countries that use ISO paper sizes (as specified by ISO 216), which is most countries, use a two- or four-hole system for holding A4 sheets. The ISO standard two holes are 80 millimetres (3.1 in) apart, according to ISO 838. The four-hole version has no ISO standard. The distances between holes are 80 millimetres (3.1 in) (3 × 8).

The most common type in Canada and the United States is a three-ring system for letter size pages (8 1/2 by 11 inches or 220 mm × 280 mm), whose size is similar to ISO 216-based A4 size. A standard 8 1/2 by 11 inches (220 mm × 280 mm) sheet of paper has three holes with spacing of 4 1/4 inches (110 mm). There is a variant for half-letter size pages (8 1/2 by 5 1/2 inches or 220 mm × 140 mm), whose three rings are 2 3/4 inches (70 mm) apart. "Ledger" size binders hold 11-by-17-inch (28 by 43 cm) paper, and may use standard 3-ring spacing or multiple additional rings.

The distance from the punched holes to the nearest edge of the paper is less critical, since small differences do not affect the compatibility of paper and binder. Typical distance from the paper edge to the center of the hole is 0.5 inches (13 mm), and typical diameter of the hole ranges from 0.25 inches (6.4 mm) to 0.31 inches (7.9 mm) in North American usage.

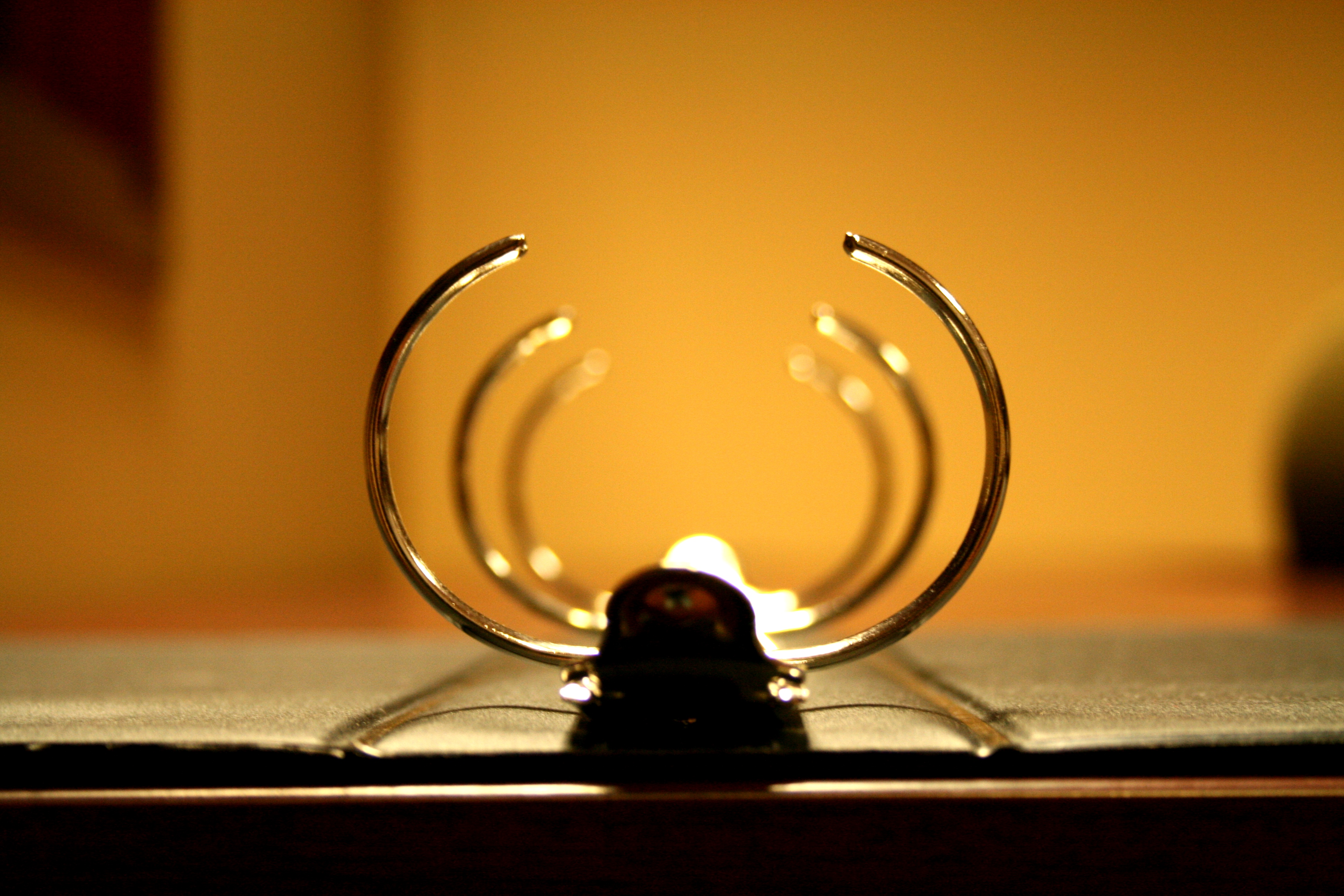
Three ring binder sprung clip mechanism

Japan uses a rare system, referred to as J-Binder. This system is compatible with A4 and B5 paper with different products. The A4 version uses 30 closely spaced rings, while the B5 one uses 26. Less common variants such as a 20 ring A5 version also exist.

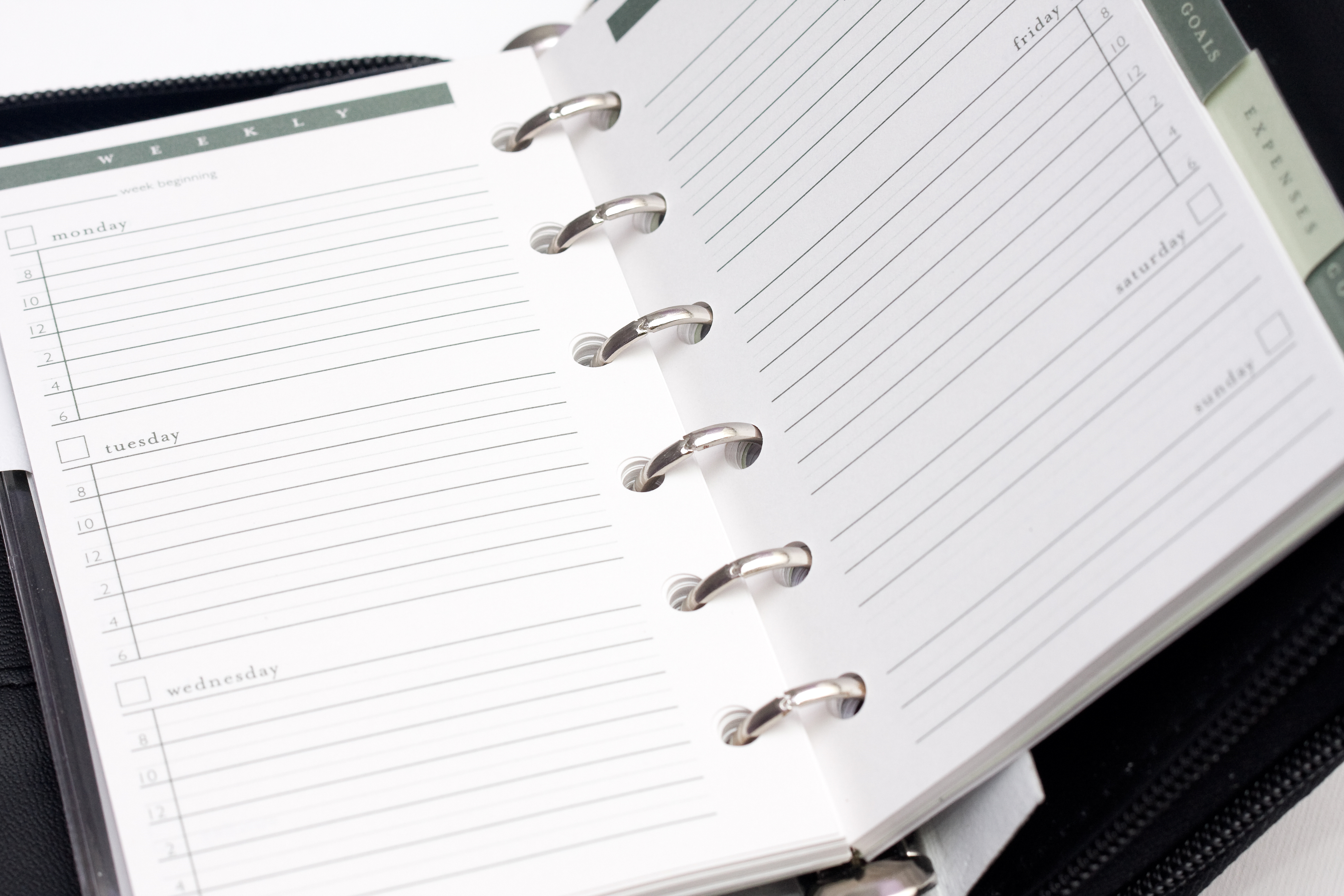
Personal organizer with metallic ring binder

Many personal organizers and memorandum books use a six- or seven-hole system, including Filofax and FranklinCovey. Most systems have the rings on the left side of the papers as one opens the binder, but there are also binders that have the rings (concealed by the binder cover) at the top edge of the paper, reminiscent of a clipboard.

There are also various options of binder types such as the commonly used vinyl binders or customizable poly binders, turned edge binders, and sewn binders.

Most binder covers are made of three pieces, in the fashion of a hardback book, with three pieces of board held together with sheets of vinyl or other materials and hinges. Materials vary widely. Some vinyl binders have a clear pocket on the outside for cover pages, and many have pockets in the inner cover for loose papers, business cards, compact discs, etc. There are also zipper binders, which zip the binder up and keep papers from falling out. Some binders are stored in matching slipcases for greater protection; either with one slipcase per each binder, or one slipcase holding several binders.

It is also possible to insert the sheet of paper into a polypropylene sheet protector. The sheet protector has pre-punched holes, so the document can be kept untouched and unwrinkled.

== Gallery ==
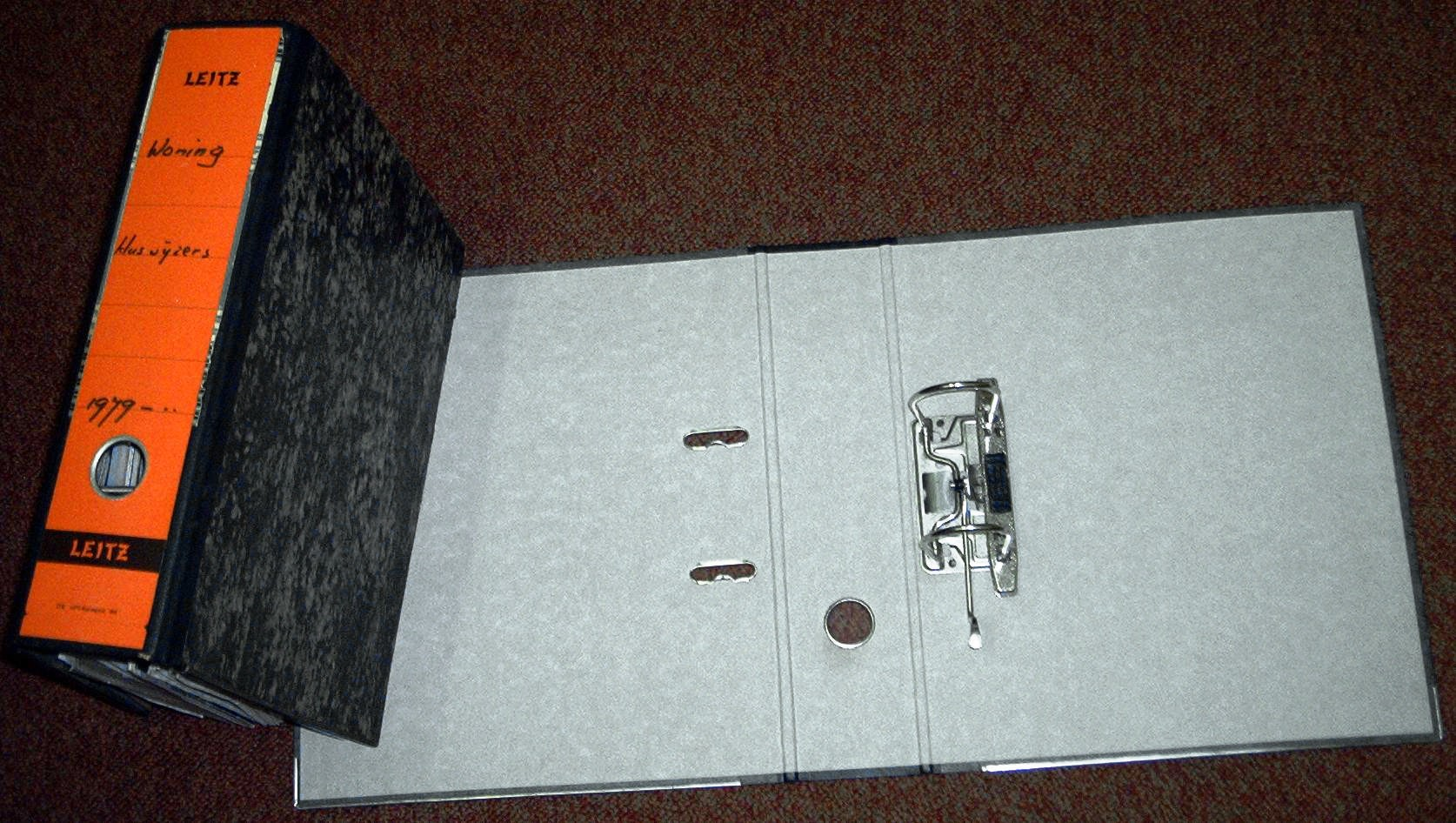
Two-ring binders, in open (right) and closed (left) positions

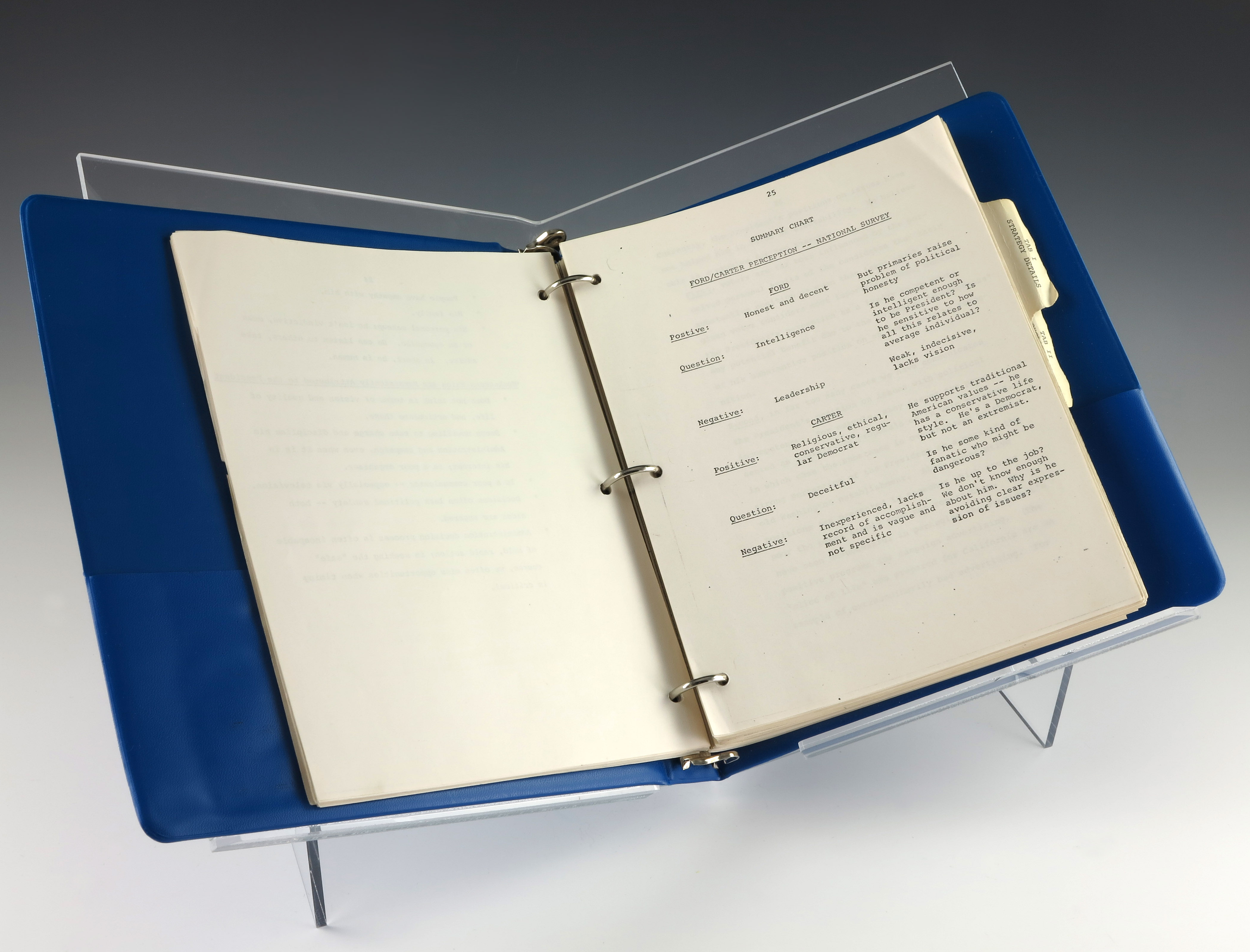
Three-ring binder, open

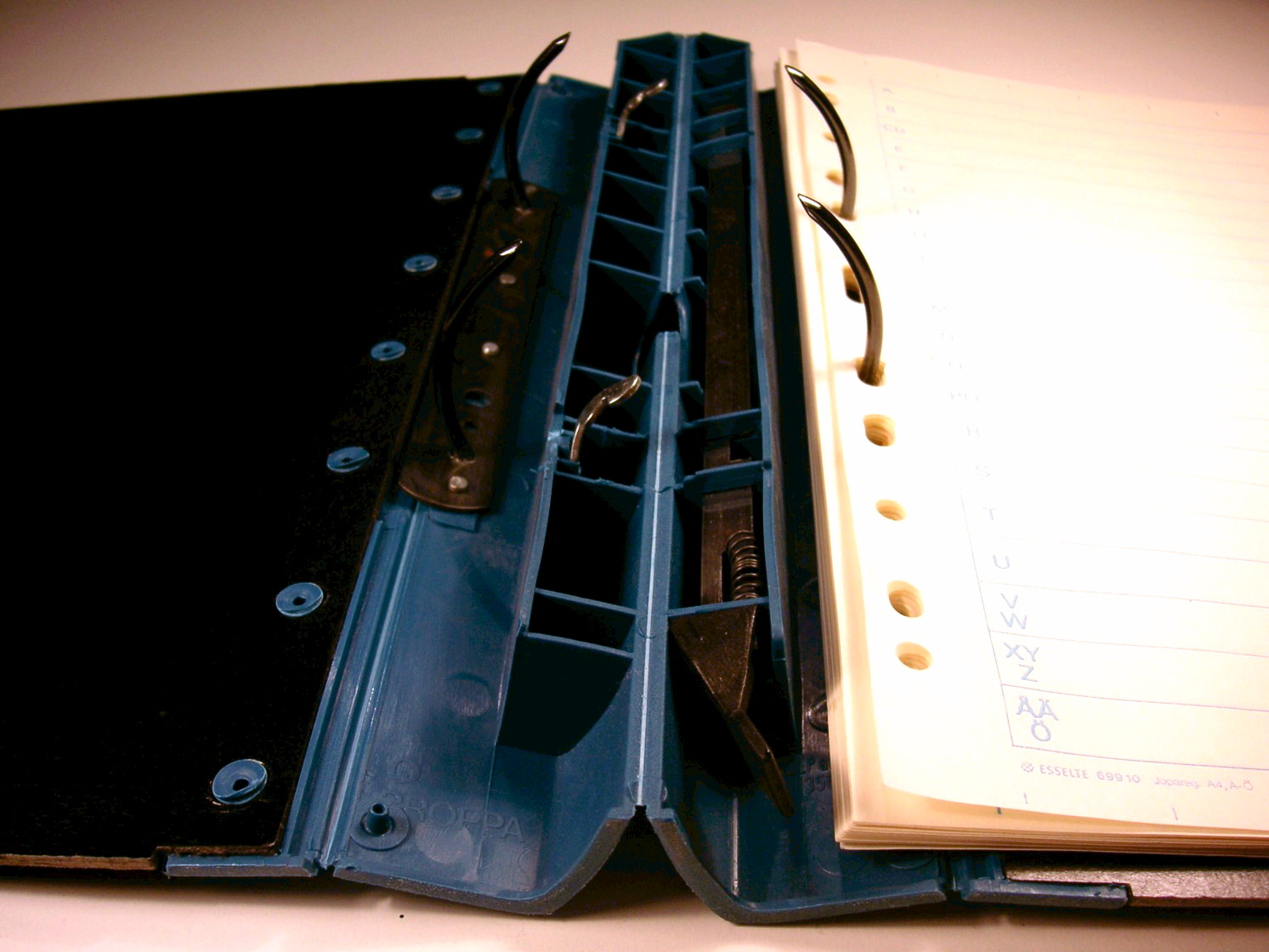
Tengwall's four-ring "fork" binder, open

An alternative for archiving magazines

== See also ==
- Hole punch
- Punched pocket
- Loose leaf
- Notebook
- Springback binder
- Card binder
