= Punched pocket =

Flat plastic bag used to hold paper documents

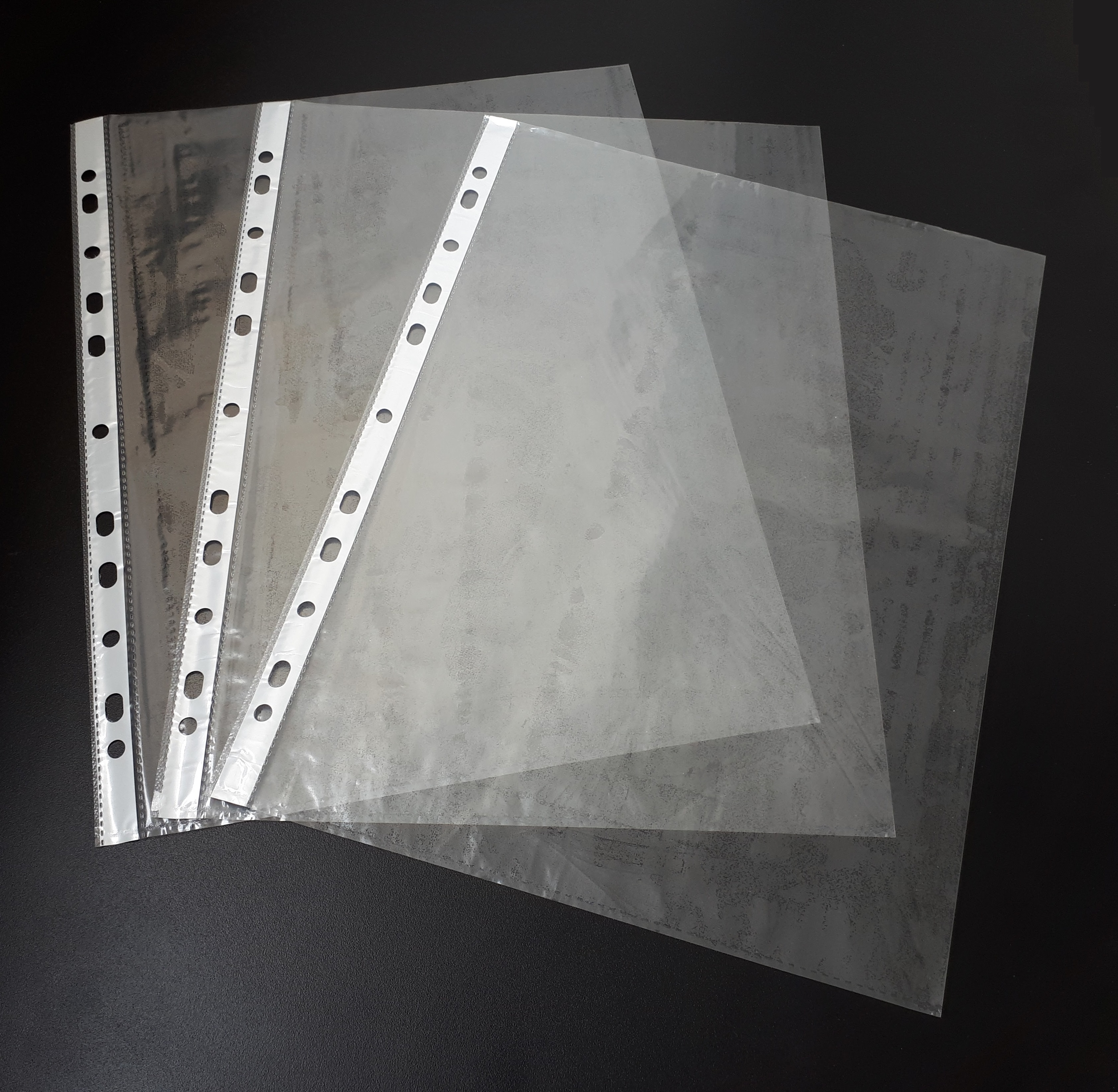
Three punched pockets

A punched pocket (UK English), also known as plastic sleeves (AU English), page protector (US English), slippery fish (UK English) and poly pocket in Scotland, and is a flat, slit plastic bag with a perforated edge used to hold and protect paper documents.

== Physical characteristics ==
Punched pockets are usually transparent or semi-transparent, to allow viewing of the contents of a document without removing it. Color pockets are also available. They protect paper documents from tears, water, food, stains, and fingerprints, and partially prevent such documents from being crumpled. Punched pockets have several holes in the left edge, which allow them to be bound into a file folder or ring binder. The holes in the punched pockets dispose of the difficulty of making holes in a paper document.

The most commonly used material for punched pockets is polypropylene. However, there are some punched pockets made of polyethylene, cellophane, or other plastics. These may include recycled and biodegradable plastics (as defined by ASTM D5511) as well as plastics with antimicrobial additives. The clarity of the plastic will vary with the thickness of the pocket due to the semicrystalline nature of the polymers and light scattering by particles. Typically, biaxially-oriented polypropylene (BOPP) is used to improve clarity of punched pockets. In the UK, the most see-through punched pockets are referred to as 'glass clear' and the less clear ones as having an 'orange peel' finish. Using the customary unit of plastic thickness, the mil (1/1000 inch), punched pockets are produced in various thicknesses for different uses, and may or may not cover both sides of the document completely. The thinnest pockets may be less than 2 mil (0.051 mm), while the thickest are over 4 mil (0.10 mm).

Punched pockets are made in several sizes, with the most prevalent being A4 (210 mm × 297 mm; 8.3 in × 11.7 in) for Europe, or 8.5 by 11 inches (216 by 279 mm) for the United States.

Depending on the location of the opening, punched pockets may be top-loading or side-loading which dictates how the document is inserted into the pocket. Some pockets may only be sealed on two of the four sides, allowing for more convenient insertion or removal of their contents.

== Usage ==
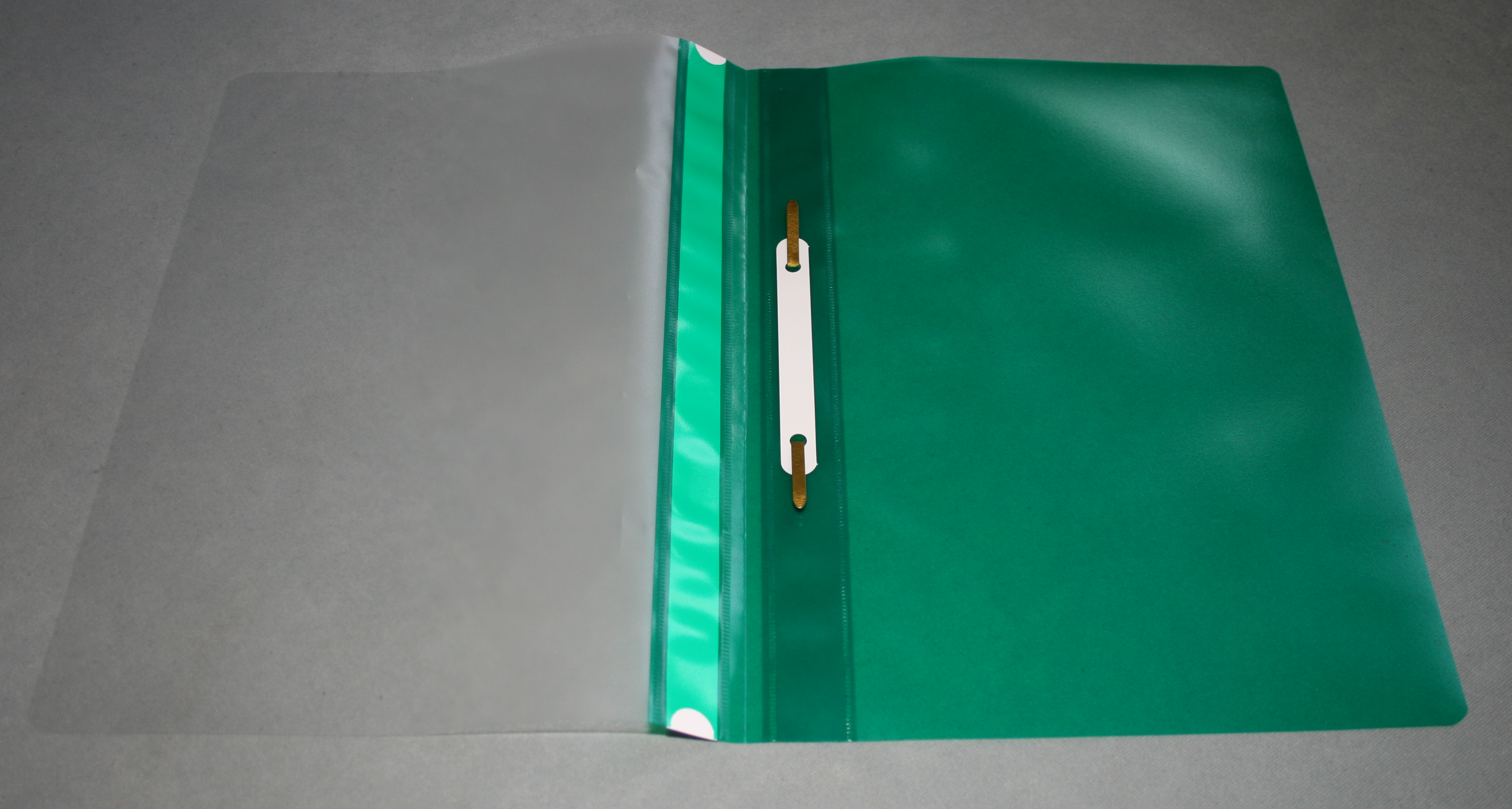
An open file which can be used with punched pockets.

A punched pocket can contain only a small number of paper sheets. Often there is only one sheet per pocket. Sometimes a punched pocket contains two sheets, each with one-sided text outward.

One can see attached punched pockets, each containing a page with some information, in some banks, post offices and polyclinics. These pockets allow numerous visitors to read the information closely without soiling, deterioration, or accidental removal. Restaurant menus frequently use punched pockets.

Archivists and conservationists do not use punched pockets to preserve documents as they may create micro-climates, react with inks and stick to the paper.
