= Hollingsworth & Vose =

US manufacturer

Hollingsworth & Vose headquarters in East Walpole, Massachusetts.

Hollingsworth & Vose Company (H&V) is a global manufacturer of nonwoven materials and engineered papers used in filtration, energy, and industrial applications. The firm is a privately held business founded in 1843; its headquarters are in East Walpole, Massachusetts, USA.

H&V manufactures wet-laid, dry-laid, meltblown, Nanofiber, MFM adsorptive fibers, and develops aqueous and solvent-based saturation, coating, composite, and laminating technologies.

The company is divided into three business divisions: air and liquid filtration media; battery separators and energy products; and industrial products. In 2014 the company operates 12 manufacturing sites, 15 sales offices, and four research centers globally.

== History ==
H&V was founded in 1843 by John Mark and Lyman Hollingsworth, sons of Mark Hollingsworth, a foreman for the paper makers Jeremiah Smith Boies and Edmund Tileston.

The brothers found that paper made from a scrap pile of manila bolt ropes cut from old sails was very strong and suitable for industrial applications; they were granted a patent by the U.S. Patent Office for the manufacture of paper from manila fiber. In 1852 Lyman Hollingsworth purchased an existing paper mill on the site of the present West Groton Mill of Hollingsworth & Vose Company. Until 1881 it was used to manufacture paper from jute and manila for tag paper, pattern paper, abrasive backing, and wrapping paper. These products were sold both domestically and abroad.

In 1871 Zachary T. Hollingsworth, nephew of Lyman Hollingsworth and son of Amor Hollingsworth of Tileston and Hollingsworth, purchased the Kennedy Mill in East Walpole, Massachusetts on the Neponset River. Later in 1881, Hollingsworth and Charles Vose formed a partnership under the firm name of Hollingsworth and Vose. During that year, to increase the production capacity of the firm, they purchased the West Groton Mill from Lyman Hollingsworth. The new company specialized in the production of paper from jute and manila, and also used a small amount of unbleached sulphate wood pulp. In 1890 the company developed an electrical insulating paper.

In 1892 the firm became a Massachusetts corporation with Zachary T. Hollingsworth as president, Charles Vose as vice president, and E. Frank Baker as treasurer. In 1920 it entered the gasket market, a mainstay of its business for several decades. In 1921 Valentine Hollingsworth and Louis E. Vose became president and vice president respectively.

During World War II, the company supplied filter media to the U.S. military, developing a line of HEPA air filters. By 1945 it was manufacturing engine cellulosic and high efficiency micro fiber glass filter media.

After 1950 H&V entered several new industrial markets. The company developed wet-laid nonwovens for home furnishings, began manufacturing diskette liners, and later launched production of micro fiber glass battery separators.

The company also manufactured crocidolite asbestos filters for the 'Kent (cigarette) Micronite' brand of cigarettes, between 1952 and 1956, which were later the subject of millions of dollars of lawsuits paid to their employees and relatives who had already died, or who were then dying, of cancer.

In the 1990s the firm used smaller fibers to make materials such as meltblown media, chemisorptive product and process Molecular (Adsorptive) Filter Media (MFM), nanofiber coating technology. By the year 2000 the company had manufacturing sites in the United States, United Kingdom, and Europe, and opened a facility in the Asia/Pacific region in Suzhou, China in 2004, and later the Mark Hollingsworth Global Technology Center in 2011.

From 1998 to 2022, Valentine Hollingsworth was chief executive officer. He was succeeded by Josh Ayer, who has been with the company since 2009.

Global Locations

- East Walpole, MA (Corporate Headquarters)
- West Groton, MA
- Easton, NY
- Greenwich, NY
- Floyd, VA
- Hawkinsville, GA
- Corvallis, OR
- Winchcombe, England, UK
- Kentmere, England, UK
- Mysore, India
- Suzhou, China
- Hatzfeld, Germany
- Apizaco, Mexico
