= Filing cabinet =

Piece of office furniture

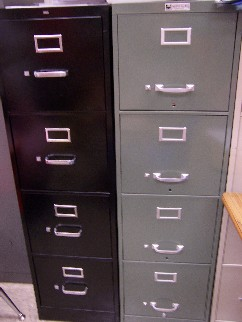
Two tall metal file cabinets for work or home use

A filing cabinet (or sometimes file cabinet in American English) is a piece of office furniture for storing paper documents in file folders. In the most simple context, it is an enclosure for drawers in which articles are stored. The two most common forms of filing cabinets are vertical files and lateral files. A vertical file cabinet has drawers that extend from the short side (typically 15 inches or 380 mm) of the cabinet. A lateral file cabinet has drawers that extend from the long side (various lengths) of the cabinet. These are also called side filers in Great Britain. There are also shelf files which go on shelves. In the United States, file cabinets are usually built to accommodate 8.5 × 11 paper, and in other countries, filing cabinets are often designed to hold other sizes of paper, such as A4 paper.

== Construction ==
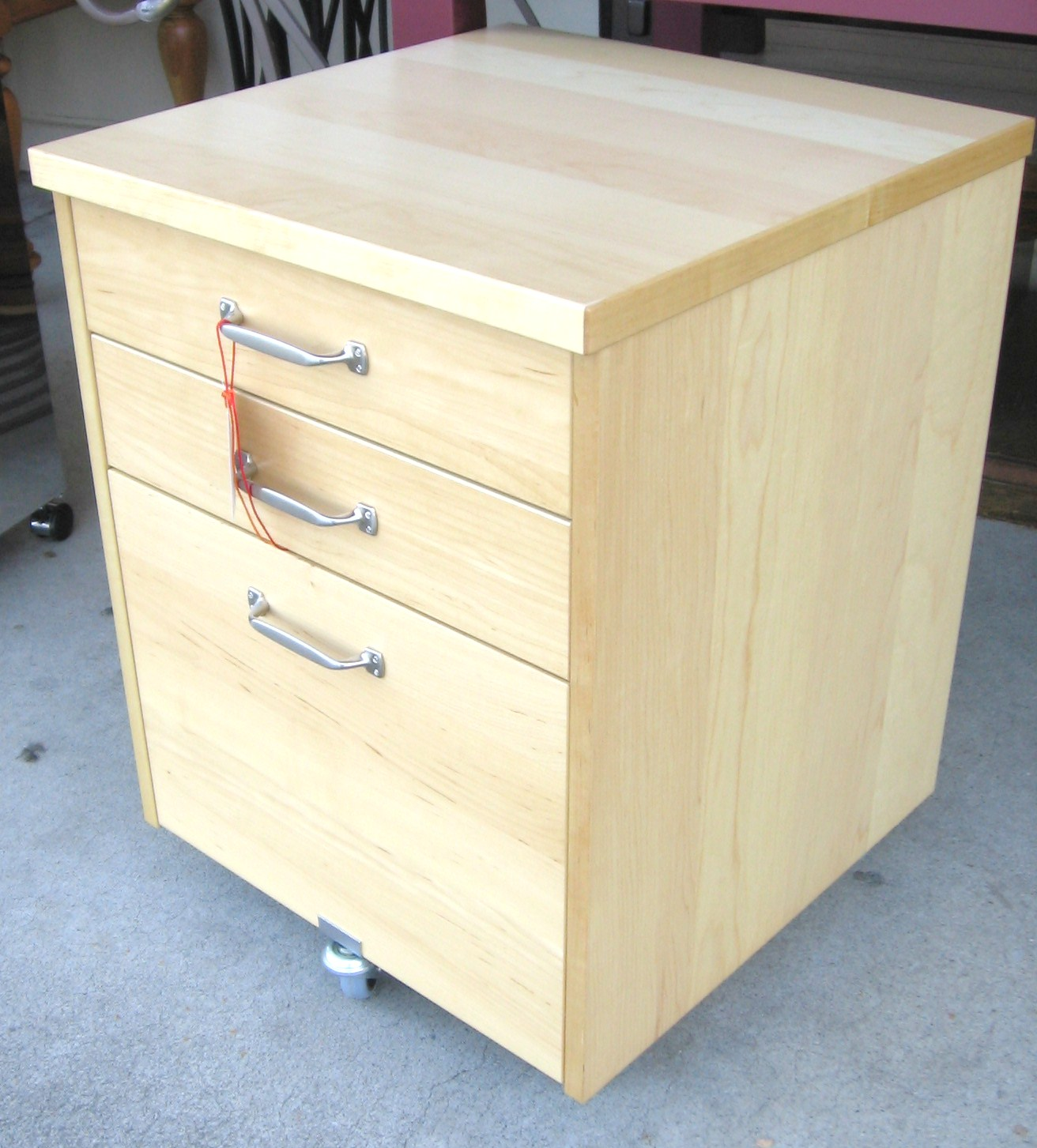
A wooden filing cabinet, with rollers for mobility.

Office filing cabinets are typically made of sheet metal or wood. The drawers usually use a drawer slide to facilitate opening the drawer which includes an "outstop" to prevent the drawer from being pulled completely out of the cabinet. To open a drawer on most metal filing cabinets, a small sliding mechanism known as a "thumblatch" must be pressed to release and open the drawer. Each drawer has a handle to grip and pull the drawer with. On the front face of each drawer, there is usually a label holder to allow the user to identify the contents of the drawer.

Many file cabinets incorporate a keyed lock to prevent unauthorized access to the documents being stored. There are two types of locks. A "cam lock" is activated with a key that rotates the lock. A "plunger lock" is opened with a key but can be closed by merely depressing the body of the lock. The plunger lock allows a user to quickly close and lock several cabinets in a short amount of time.

Some file cabinets have a metal plate or wire structure at the back of each drawer which is known as a follower block. The follower block can be adjusted forward to reduce the length of the drawer so that the file folders contained within remain upright and at the front of the drawer for easier access.

== Horizontal file ==
Henry Brown, an American inventor, patented a "receptacle for storing and preserving papers" on November 2, 1886. This was a fire and accident safe container made of forged metal, which could be sealed with a lock. It was special in that it kept the papers separated.

== Vertical file ==
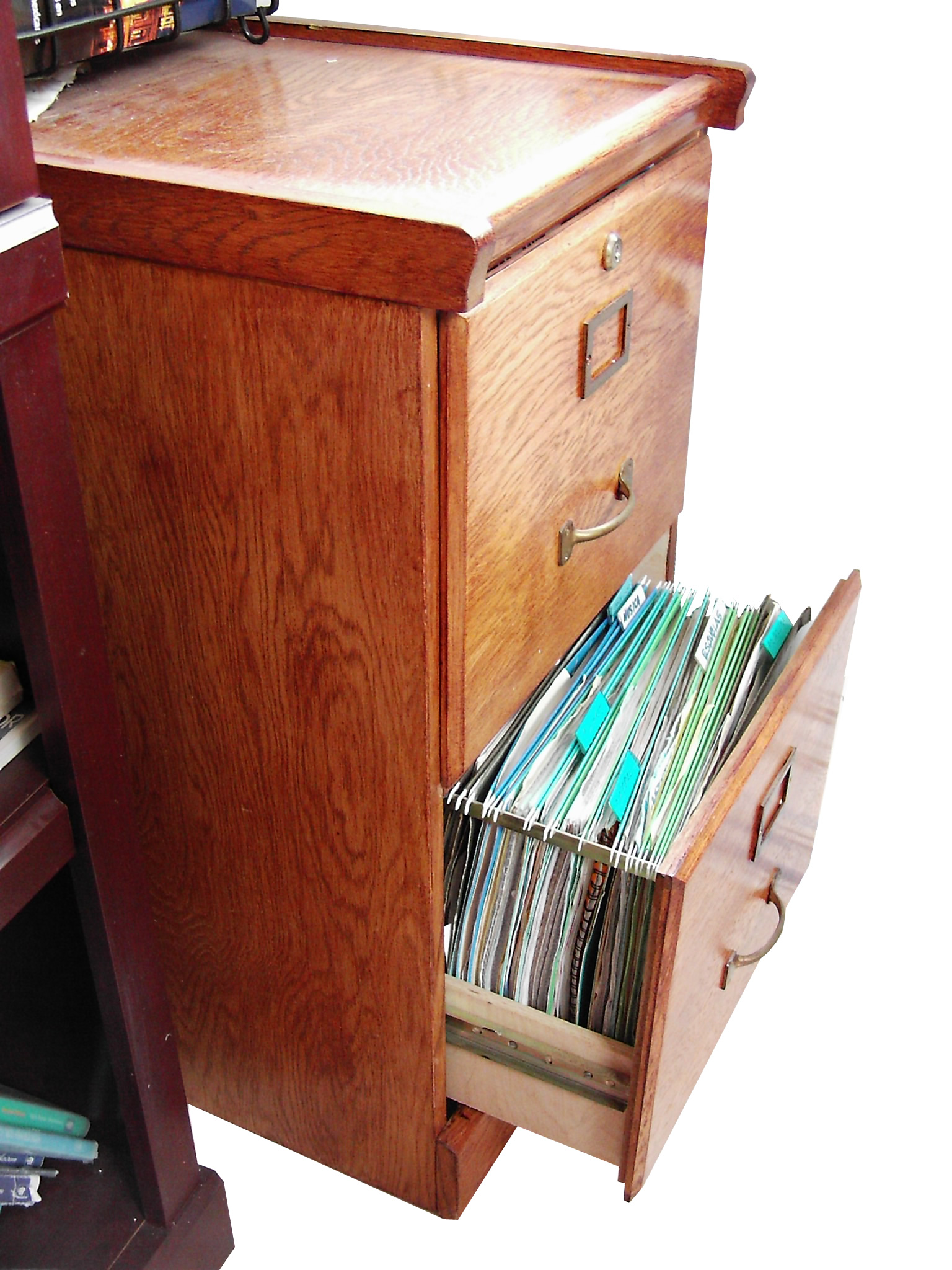
A wooden filing cabinet with drawer open

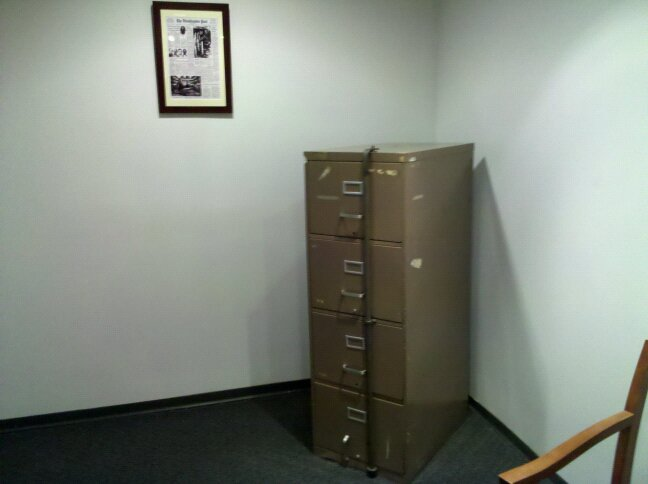
A DNC filing cabinet from the Watergate office building, damaged by the burglars

The invention of the vertical file — also occasionally referred to as the suspension file — remains an unsolved mystery. The Vertical Filing Cabinet section in the Early Office Museum website begins with a discussion of the erroneous conclusions by highly credentialed “secondary sources", concerning the origin of vertical filing. The secondary sources claimed that a gold medal was presented at the World’s Fair of 1893 for a vertical file. The Early Office Museum found no evidence to substantiate those claims. Nevertheless, the information presented in the Early Office Museum’s discussion of vertical filing cabinets suggests that the commercial introduction of vertical filing may have occurred in 1900 when a company named the Library Bureau (founded in 1876, later a division of Remington Rand) published a catalog that included a vertical filing cabinet. A US patent was filed in 1902 by the Library Bureau that credited David E. Hunter as the inventor.

Research by Ester Ellen-Poe validated The Early Office Museum's findings, and suggests that the most credible claim to the invention of vertical filing, as we know it today, appears to have been by the Library Bureau. The Library Bureau’s 1903 pamphlet titled "Library Bureau Systems of Vertical Filing with Interchangeable Unit Cabinets", begins with: "Vertical filing, as originated [emphasis added] and perfected by the Library Bureau, is the most complete, accurate and practical method ever invented [emphasis added] for taking care of correspondence, catalogs, reports, invoices, orders, duplicate bills, and loose sheets, or papers of any kind for any business—large, small or peculiar.").

In addition to the Library Bureau, early manufacturers of vertical filing cabinets included Globe-Wernicke, Yawman and Erbe Manufacturing Company, and the Art Metal Construction Company.

Prior to the introduction of commercial vertical filing cabinets businesses kept papers in envelopes in turn stored in arrays of pigeonholes often lining a wall. Finding and opening envelopes and unfolding papers was troublesome and inefficient. However, the concept of vertical filing was clearly practiced as early as 1895 when a U.S. patent (533053) was issued to W.A. Cooke, Jr. for A Receptacle for Letters or Other Papers.

After World War II, the Home-O-Nize Company was established in Muscatine, Iowa to provide returning veterans with jobs. Founded to produce steel kitchen cabinets, the company soon encountered the reality of the limited availability of steel. So the company began to make products for others. Finally a small amount of steel was secured and the company started manufacturing steel index card boxes. Soon after, larger cabinets began to be produced including filing cabinets. By designing to minimize the amount of steel, the product was an extremely cost-effective design and had huge commercial success. Home-O-Nize never did make kitchen cabinets and in 1961, the company name was changed to HON. Today, The HON Company, a division of HNI Corporation is the predominant North American manufacturer and marketer of filing cabinets.

The demand for filing cabinets was greatly expanded as a result of the commercial distribution of Xerography machines starting in 1950. This event enabled office workers to "have their own copy" of printed materials. Another influence is the expansion of government regulations that require businesses to create and keep forms and other documents. Some prognosticators have suggested the future of the filing cabinet is in doubt as electronic filing systems proliferate and become lower in cost. Nevertheless, most businesses are still purchasing computer systems with printing capabilities. Unless this trend is reversed, filing of paper is still a viable practice.

In the US, these come in two sizes: for letter-size paper and legal-size paper. Most modern commercially oriented vertical filing cabinets in the US are manufactured in two-, three-, four-, and five-drawer versions in depths of 25, 26 1/2, and 28 inches (640, 670, and 710 mm). The drawers are typically supported on a three-member suspension system that allows the drawer to be fully extended for complete access.

The four-drawer vertical file, letter width, is the version purchased by most businesses. The two-drawer file is sold mostly for use alongside a desk. The five-drawer file is mostly purchased by federal, state, and local governments (in a 28-inch-deep or 710 mm version), as it typically provides the lowest cost per filing inch. Three drawer files, the least popular version, have the advantage of being at "countertop" height so end users can easily retrieve files and use the top of the cabinet as a work area to examine file contents.

The drawers of most vertical filing cabinets are engineered to accept hanging file folders, as these have come to dominate the way most users store information. Some files still have a "follower block" in each drawer. This is a device that adjusts the apparent depth of the drawer interior so that files are kept upright in the drawer. These are the legacy of a time when most filing was done with manila folders rather than hanging files.

For home offices or lighter use applications, vertical files are manufactured in 18-inch-deep (460 mm) versions. These typically have two-member suspensions and the drawers do not fully extend.

== Lateral file ==
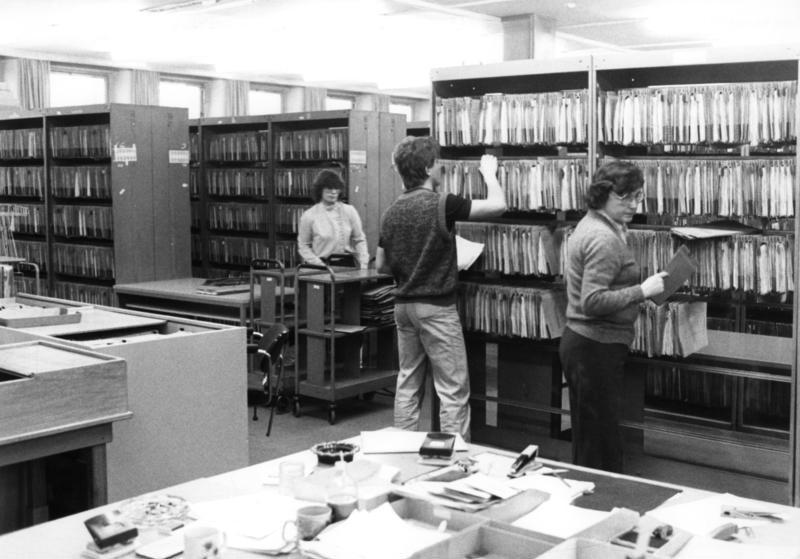
Lateral files

Lateral files are typically 20 inches (510 mm) deep and manufactured in 30,-36,-and-42-inch (760, 910, and 1,070 mm) widths and 2-, 3-, 4-, and 5-drawer versions. The 30-inch-wide (760 mm), two-drawer version is popular for use inside cubicle workstations, as it is engineered to fit under or alongside the cubicle work surfaces. Logic for the use of 3-, 4-, and 5-drawer files is similar to that of vertical files. Unlike vertical files, most lateral files allow for side-to-side or front-to-back filing.

For letter-size files arranged front-to-back, the 30-and-42-inch-wide (760 and 1,070 mm) files are the most effective, as the maximum amount of filing per cabinet is enabled. A 36-inch-wide (910 mm) file, with letter-width filing front-to-back has no more capacity than a corresponding 30-inch-wide (760 mm) file, as the additional space would be wasted.

Some users prefer side-to-side filing, as they can search index tabs from a seated position. All-width lateral files can accommodate this configuration, though the capacity of the file is somewhat diminished.

An advantage for lateral files is that access and view of all files can be easier than with a vertical file because the drawers do not extend as far.

In most instances, the top "5th drawer" of a five-drawer lateral file is a flipper door with pull-out shelf, as most people would not be able to access the top of a drawer at this height.

== Shelf file ==
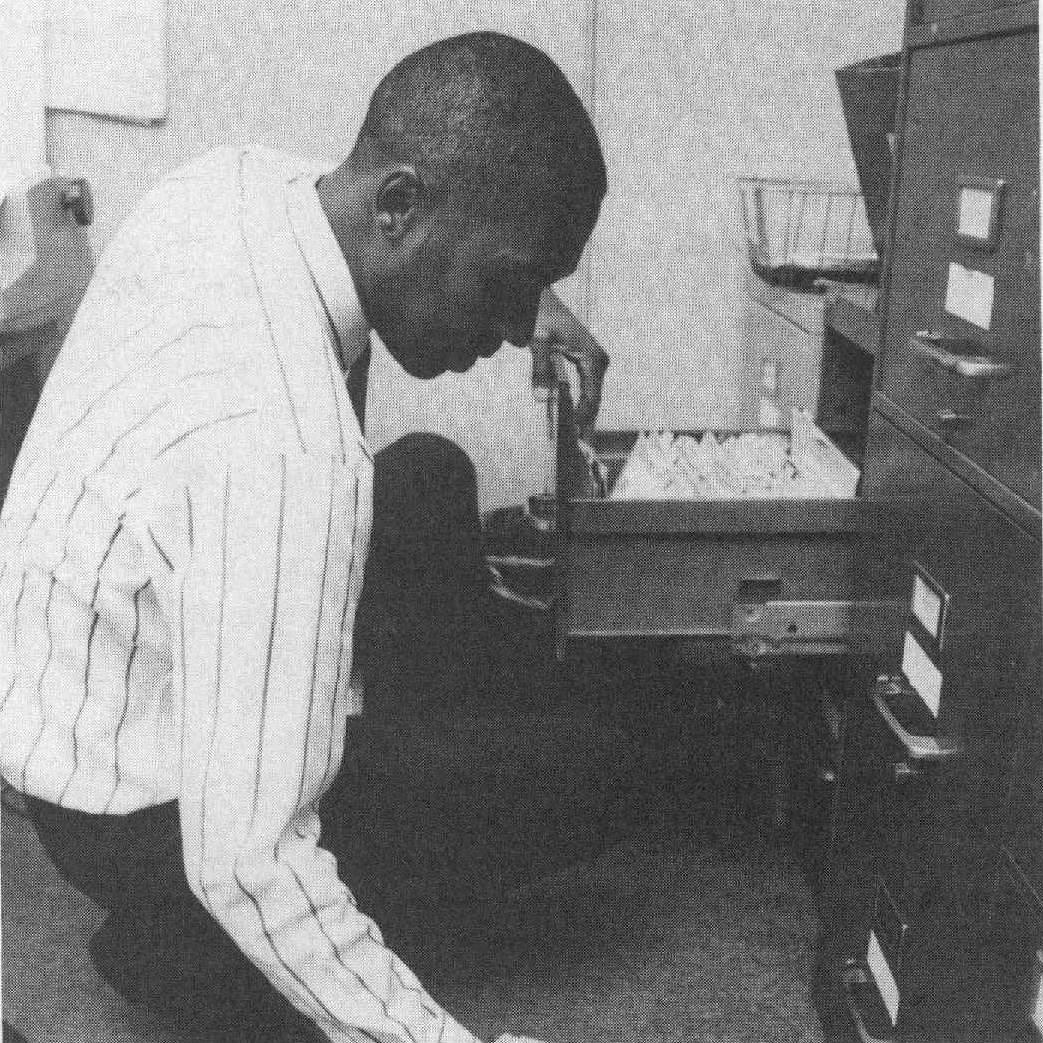
Filing clerk at work (1992)

A shelf file is a cabinet designed to accommodate folders with tabs on the side rather than on the top. The cabinet has no drawers, only shelves. Some shelf files come with doors that recede into the cabinet. These cabinets are typically 12 inches (300 mm) or 18 inches (460 mm) deep, for letter or legal size folders respectively. Like lateral files, they are made in 30 inches (760 mm), 36 inches (910 mm), 42 inches (1,100 mm), and 45 inches (1,100 mm) widths but are usually only installed in 5-high and 6-high applications.

Side tabbed files often use color codes that represent an alpha-numeric filing system. This methodology is a way to ensure files which are frequently retrieved and returned are easy to find and do not get lost. Finding a file is easy as to color-coded tabs easily lead the human eye to the appropriate location in the filing system. Similarly, a misfiled folder is obvious as an out-of-sequence color code is obvious to the user.

Businesses such as doctors, dentists, veterinarians, police, and government agencies use shelf files and end-tabbed folders to manage large filing systems.

Variations on traditional shelf files, designed to offer increased capacity for a given floor area, include Rotary Storage systems.

== Specifications ==
In the United States, the primary standard for vertical filing cabinets is the Business and Institutional Furniture Manufacturer's Association (BIFMA) Standard X5.3. BIFMA used to maintain a separate Standard X5.2 for lateral filing cabinets, but that standard has been withdrawn. The standards provide requirements for cabinet stability, durability, and strength, among others. The General Services Administration (GSA) also maintains standards for vertical and lateral steel filing cabinets, A-A-3186 and A-A-3187 respectively. The GSA standards define two grades of filing cabinets, medium- and heavy-duty. They reference the BIFMA standard for the medium-duty cabinets, and provide additional performance requirements for the heavy-duty cabinets. The GSA is also responsible for maintaining the standards for filing cabinets and security containers for storing classified materials; more information on that subject may be found in the article on classified information in the United States.

In the United Kingdom the dimensions and certain aspects of rigidity, construction, and safety are covered by BS 4438:1969 and BS EN 14073-2:2004. The safety standards revolve particularly against stability with drawers fully open. Interlocking mechanisms to prevent opening two drawers at once are not mandatory, but the employer's responsibility under the Health and Safety at Work etc. Act 1974 makes them advisable. In other EU states the EN 14073-2:2004 harmonised standard will be endorsed by the relevant standards agency, such as DIN in Germany.

In Australia filing cabinets should be to AS 5079 a modified version of ANSI BIFMA X5.2-1997.

== Filing outside the US ==
Non-US firms offer filing cabinets that permit A4 paper to be used in addition to letter-size. Double file cabinets have drawers which can each accommodate two racks for folders side by side.

Many European companies engineer filing systems that accommodate hanging folders only; there are no drawer bottoms. In the US, most file drawers still have bottoms in the drawers so materials of any sort can be stored.

UK filing cabinets are slightly different from US in the width of the rails which support the suspension files, the US ones being narrower; the UK sizes are known as A4, foolscap and A3.

== Decline ==
As some offices have tended towards paperless operation (storing more and more information on computers, rather than on paper), filing cabinets and other office furniture for long-term archival storage have been less in demand.

== Benefits of a filing cabinet ==
Filing cabinets are important in modern offices because offices have to deal with large volumes of paperwork and files on a daily basis.

- File cabinets are a reliable way to store important paper documents.
- File cabinets save time and energy during work by offering files and papers stored in a designated place.
- The file cabinet is a useful tool for any office as paper can clutter desks and other places.
- Filing cabinets reduce the chance to loss of company information and papers.

== See also ==
- Card catalog
- Visible file
