= Paper size =

Standard sizes of paper

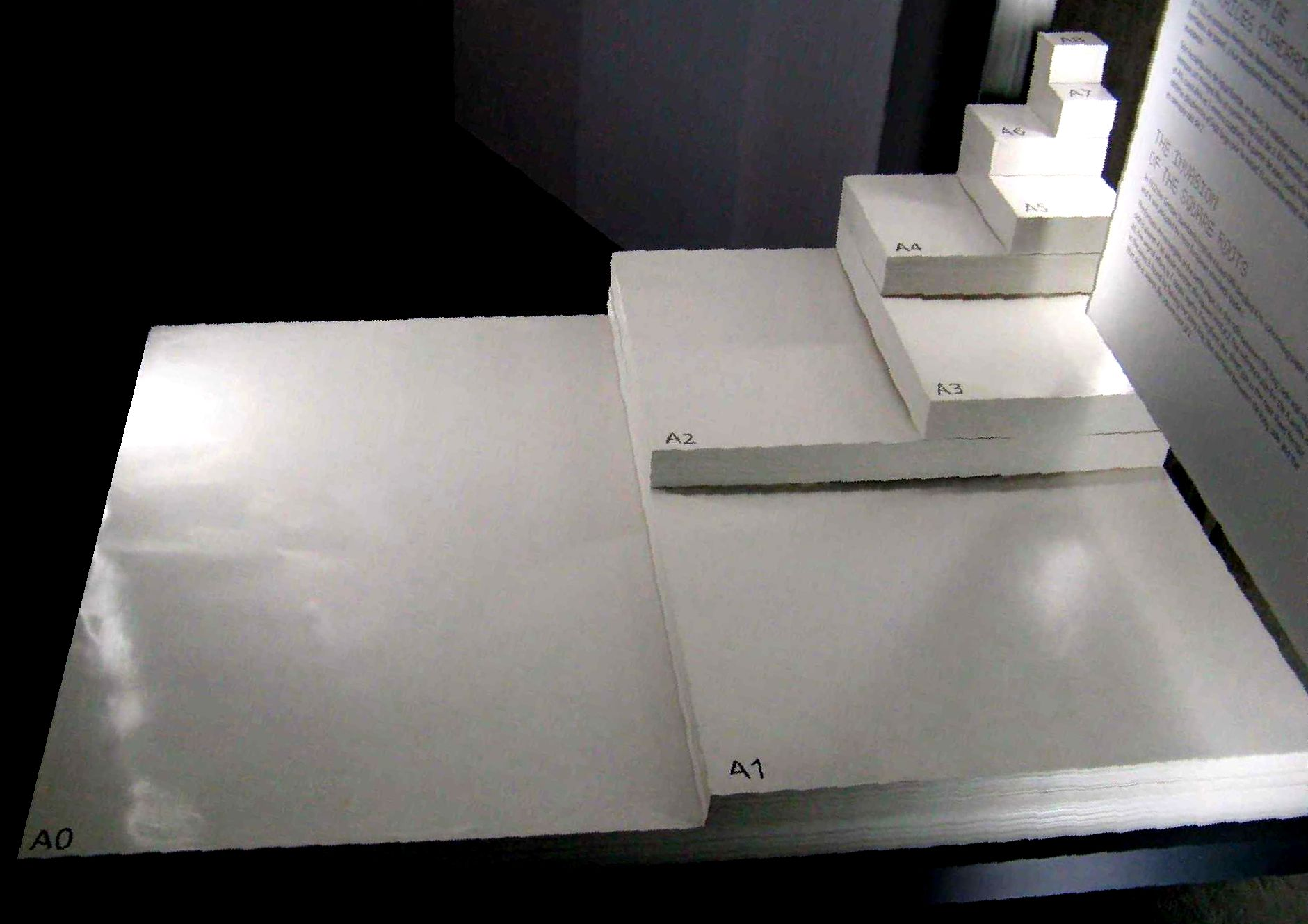
Paper sizes A0 to A8, life-size installation The Invasion of the Square Roots at the CosmoCaixa Barcelona science museum

A size chart illustrating the ISO A series and a comparison with American letter and legal formats

Comparison of some paper and photographic paper sizes close to the A4 size

Paper size standards govern the size of sheets of paper used as writing paper, stationery, cards, and for some printed documents. Most countries adhere to the ISO 216 standard, which includes the widely recognized A series (including A4 paper), defined by a consistent aspect ratio of √2. The system, first proposed in the 18th century and formalized in 1975, allows scaling between sizes without distortion. Regional variations exist, such as the North American paper sizes (e.g., Letter, Legal, and Ledger) which are governed by the ANSI and are used in North America and parts of Central and South America.

The standardization of paper sizes emerged from practical needs for efficiency. The ISO 216 system originated as DIN 476, later adopted internationally for its mathematical precision. The origins of North American sizes are lost in tradition and not well documented, although the Letter size (8.5 in × 11 in; 216 mm × 279 mm) became dominant in the US and Canada due to historical trade practices in the 20th century. Other historical systems, such as the British Foolscap and Imperial sizes, have largely been phased out in favour of ISO or ANSI standards.

Regional preferences reflect cultural and industrial legacies. In addition to ISO and ANSI standards, Japan uses its JIS P 0138 system, which closely aligns with ISO 216 but includes unique B-series variants commonly used for books and posters. Specialized industries also employ non-standard sizes: newspapers use custom formats like Berliner and broadsheet, while envelopes and business cards follow distinct sizing conventions. The international standard for envelopes is the C series of ISO 269.

== International standard paper sizes ==
Map of the world showing adoption of paper sizes, according to the Common Locale Data Repository in 2017 ISO A4 exclusively ISO A4 primarily US-Letter primarily US-Letter predominantly US-Letter exclusively

The international paper size standard is ISO 216. It is based on the German DIN 476 standard for paper sizes. Each ISO paper size is one half of the area of the next larger size in the same series. ISO paper sizes are all based on a single aspect ratio of the square root of 2, or approximately 1:1.41421. There are different series, as well as several extensions.

The following international paper sizes are included in Cascading Style Sheets (CSS): A3, A4, A5, B4, B5.

=== A series ===
A size chart illustrating the ISO A series

There are 11 sizes in the A series, designated A0–A10, all of which have an aspect ratio of $a/b = \sqrt{2} \approx 1.41421$, where $a$ is the long side and $b$ is the short side.

Since A series sizes share the same aspect ratio $(\sqrt{2}),$ they can be scaled to other A series sizes without being distorted, and two sheets can be reduced to fit on exactly one sheet without any cutoff or margins.

The A0 base size is defined as having an area of 1 m^{2}; given an aspect ratio of $\sqrt{2}$, the dimensions of A0 are:

$\sqrt[4]2\,\mathrm{m}$ by $\frac1\sqrt[4]2\,\mathrm{m}$.

or, rounded to the nearest millimetre, 1,189 mm × 841 mm (46.8 in × 33.1 in).

A series sizes are related in that the smaller dimension of a given size is the larger dimension of the next smaller size, and folding an A series sheet in half in its larger dimension—that is, folding it in half parallel to its short edge—results in two halves that are each the size of the next smaller A series size. As such, a folded brochure of a given A-series size can be made by folding sheets of the next larger size in half, e.g. A4 sheets can be folded to make an A5 brochure. The aspect ratio $a/b$ that allows this can be derived as follows:

$\frac{a}{b} = \frac{b}{\frac{a}{2}} \implies a \cdot \frac{a}{2} = b \cdot b \implies a^2 = 2 \cdot b^2 \implies \frac{a^2}{b^2} = 2 \implies \frac{a}{b} = \sqrt{2}.$

The advantages of basing a paper size upon an aspect ratio of $\sqrt{2}$ were noted in 1786 by the German scientist and philosopher Georg Christoph Lichtenberg. He also observed that some raw sizes already adhered to that ratio so that when a sheet is folded, the length to width ratio does not change.

Briefly after the introduction of the metric system, a handful of new paper formats equivalent to modern ones were developed in France, having been published for judicial purposes in 1798 during the French Revolution:

- Grand registre (A2)
- Moyen papier (A3)
- Grand papier (B3)
- Petit papier (B4)
- Demi feuille (B5)
- Effets de commerce (B6)

These were never widely adopted, however.

Early in the 20th century, the ratio was used to specify the world format starting with 1 cm (0.39 in) as the short edge of the smallest size. Walter Porstmann started with the largest sizes instead, assigning one an area of 1 m^{2} (11 sq ft) (A0) and the other a short edge of 1 m (3 ft 3 in) (B0). He thereby turned the forgotten French sizes (relatively few in number) into a logically-simple and comprehensive plan for a full range of paper sizes, while introducing systematic alphanumeric monikers for them. Generalized to nothing less than four series, this system was introduced as a DIN standard (DIN 476) in Germany in 1922, replacing a vast variety of other paper formats. Even today, the paper sizes are called "DIN A4" (IPA: [diːn.ʔaː.fiːɐ̯]) in everyday use in Germany and Austria.

The DIN 476 standard spread quickly to other countries. Before the outbreak of World War II, it had been adopted by the following countries in Europe:

- Belgium (1924)
- Netherlands (1925)
- Norway (1926)
- Finland (1927)
- Switzerland (1929)
- Sweden (1930) with later extensions
- Soviet Union (1934) with custom extensions
- Hungary (1938)
- Italy (1939)

During World War II, the standard spread to South America and was adopted by Uruguay (1942), Argentina (1943) and Brazil (1943), and afterwards spread to other countries:

- Australia (1974)
- Austria (1948)
- Bangladesh (1972)
- Barbados (1973)
- Chile (1968)
- Colombia (1975)
- Czechoslovakia (1953)
- Denmark (1953)
- Ecuador (1974)
- France (1967)
- Greece (1970)
- Iceland (1964)
- India (1957) with custom extensions
- Iran (1948)
- Ireland (1959)
- Israel (1954)
- Japan (1951) with different B series
- Kuwait (1975)
- Mexico (1965)
- New Zealand (1963)
- Peru (1967)
- Poland (1957)
- Portugal (1954)
- Rhodesia (1970)
- Romania (1949)
- Singapore (1970)
- South Africa (1966)
- Spain (1947)
- Thailand (1973)
- Turkey (1967)
- United Kingdom (1971)
- Venezuela (1962)
- Yugoslavia(1956)

By 1975, so many countries were using the German system that it was established as an ISO standard, as well as the official United Nations document format. By 1977, A4 was the standard letter format in 88 of 148 countries. Today the standard has been adopted by all countries in the world except the United States and Canada. In Mexico, Costa Rica, Colombia, Venezuela, Chile, and the Philippines, the US letter format is still in common use, despite their official adoption of the ISO standard.

The weight of an A-series sheet of a given paper weight can be calculated by knowing the ratio of its size to the A0 sheet. For example, an A4 sheet is 1/16 the size of an A0 sheet, so if it is made from 80 g/m^{2} paper, it weighs 1/16 of 80 g (2.8 oz), which is 5 g (0.18 oz).

=== B series ===
A size chart illustrating the ISO B series

The B series paper sizes are less common than the A series. They have the same aspect ratio as the A series:

$\frac{a}{b}=\sqrt{2} = 1.41421...$

However, they have a different area. The area of B series sheets is in fact the geometric mean of successive A series sheets. B1 is between A0 and A1 in size, with an area of $\frac{1}{\sqrt{2}}$ m^{2}, or about 0.707 m^{2} (7.61 sq ft). As a result, B0 is 1 metre wide, and other sizes of the series are a half, a quarter, or further fractions of a metre wide: in general, every B size has exactly one side of length $\frac{1 \operatorname{m}}{2^n}$ for $n \in \mathbb{N}$. That side is the short side for B0, B2, B4, etc., and the long side for B1, B3, B5, etc.

While less common in office use, the B series is used for a variety of applications in which one A-series size would be too small but the next A-series size is too large, or because they are convenient for a particular purpose.

- B4, B5, and B6 are used for envelopes that will hold C-series envelopes.
- B4 is quite common in printed music sheets.
- B5 is a relatively common choice for books.
- B7 is equal to the passport size ID-3 from ISO/IEC 7810.
- Many posters use B-series paper or a close approximation, such as 50 cm × 70 cm ~ B2.

The B-series is widely used in the printing industry to describe both paper sizes and printing press sizes, including digital presses. B3 paper is used to print two US letter or A4 pages side by side using imposition; four pages would be printed on B2, eight on B1, etc.

=== C series ===
A size chart illustrating the ISO C series

The C series is defined in ISO 269, which was withdrawn in 2009 without a replacement, but is still specified in several national standards. It is primarily used for envelopes. The area of C series sheets is the geometric mean of the areas of the A and B series sheets of the same number; for instance, the area of a C4 sheet is the geometric mean of the areas of an A4 sheet and a B4 sheet. This means that C4 is slightly larger than A4, and slightly smaller than B4. The practical usage of this is that a letter written on A4 paper fits inside a C4 envelope, and both A4 paper and C4 envelopes fit inside a B4 envelope.

Some envelope formats with mixed sides from adjacent sizes (and thus an approximate aspect ratio of 2:1) are also defined in national adaptations of the ISO standard, e.g. DIN C6/C5 (also known as C65) is 114 mm × 229 mm where the common side to C5 and C6 is 162 mm. This format allows an envelope holding an A-sized paper folded in three, e.g. for the C65, an A4.

=== Overview of ISO paper sizes ===
ISO paper sizes in portrait view (with rounded inch values)
Format	A series			B series			C series		
Size	short × long		Notional area	short × long		Notional area	short × long		Notional area
Size	mm	in	m^{2}	mm	in	m^{2}	mm	in	m^{2}
0	841 × 1189	33.1 × 46.8	2^{0} = 1	1000 × 1414	39.4 × 55.7	2^{1/2} ≈ 1.414	917 × 1297	36.1 × 51.1	2^{1/4} ≈ 1.189
1	594 × 841	23.4 × 33.1	2^{−1} = 0.5	707 × 1000	27.8 × 39.4	2^{−1/2} ≈ 0.707	648 × 917	25.5 × 36.1	2^{−3/4} ≈ 0.595
2	420 × 594	16.5 × 23.4	2^{−2} = 0.25	500 × 707	19.7 × 27.8	2^{−1 1/2} ≈ 0.354	458 × 648	18.0 × 25.5	2^{−1 3/4} ≈ 0.297
3	297 × 420	11.7 × 16.5	2^{−3} = 0.125	353 × 500	13.9 × 19.7	2^{−2 1/2} ≈ 0.177	324 × 458	12.8 × 18.0	2^{−2 3/4} ≈ 0.149
4	210 × 297	8.3 × 11.7	2^{−4} = 0.0625	250 × 353	9.8 × 13.9	2^{−3 1/2} ≈ 0.088	229 × 324	9.0 × 12.8	2^{−3 3/4} ≈ 0.0743
5	148 × 210	5.8 × 8.3	2^{−5} ≈ 0.0313	176 × 250	6.9 × 9.8	2^{−4 1/2} ≈ 0.044	162 × 229	6.4 × 9.0	2^{−4 3/4} ≈ 0.0372
6	105 × 148	4.1 × 5.8	2^{−6} ≈ 0.0156	125 × 176	4.9 × 6.9	2^{−5 1/2} ≈ 0.0221	114 × 162	4.5 × 6.4	2^{−5 3/4} ≈ 0.0186
7	74 × 105	2.9 × 4.1	2^{−7} ≈ 0.0078	88 × 125	3.5 × 4.9	2^{−6 1/2} ≈ 0.0110	81 × 114	3.2 × 4.5	2^{−6 3/4} ≈ 0.0093
8	52 × 74	2.0 × 2.9	2^{−8} ≈ 0.0039	62 × 88	2.4 × 3.5	2^{−7 1/2} ≈ 0.0055	57 × 81	2.2 × 3.2	2^{−7 3/4} ≈ 0.0046
9	37 × 52	1.5 × 2.0	2^{−9} ≈ 0.0020	44 × 62	1.7 × 2.4	2^{−8 1/2} ≈ 0.0028	40 × 57	1.6 × 2.2	2^{−8 3/4} ≈ 0.0023
10	26 × 37	1.0 × 1.5	2^{−10} ≈ 0.00098	31 × 44	1.2 × 1.7	2^{−9 1/2} ≈ 0.0014	28 × 40	1.1 × 1.6	2^{−9 3/4} ≈ 0.0012
i	$\left(\alpha_A\cdot r^{i+1}\right) \times \left(\alpha_A\cdot r^{i}\right),$ where $\alpha_A = \sqrt[4]{2}\,\text{m}; r=\tfrac{1}{\sqrt{2}}$			$\left(\alpha_B\cdot r^{i+1}\right) \times \left(\alpha_B\cdot r^{i}\right),$ where $\alpha_B = \sqrt{2}\,\text{m}; r=\tfrac{1}{\sqrt{2}}$			$\left(\alpha_C\cdot r^{i+1}\right) \times \left(\alpha_C\cdot r^{i}\right),$ where $\alpha_C = \sqrt[8]{8}\,\text{m}; r=\tfrac{1}{\sqrt{2}}$		

The $\alpha$ variables are the distinct first terms in the three geometric progressions of the same common ratio equal to the square root of two. Each of the three geometric progressions (corresponding to the three series A, B, and C) is formed by all possible paper dimensions (length and width) of the series arranged in decreasing order. This arrangement of dimensions is also useful—not only does it form a geometric progression with easy-to-remember formulae, but also each consecutive pair of values (like a sliding window of size 2) will automatically correspond to the dimensions of a standard paper format in the series.

The tolerances specified in the standard are

- ±1.5 mm (0.059 in) for dimensions up to 150 mm (5.9 in),
- ±2 mm (0.079 in) for lengths in the range 150 to 600 mm (5.9 to 23.6 in) and
- ±3 mm (0.12 in) for any dimension above 600 mm (24 in).

=== Related regional sizes ===
==== German original ====
The German standard DIN 476 was published on 18 August 1922 and is the original specification of the A, B and C sizes. In 1991, it was split into DIN 476-1 for the A and B formats and 476-2 for the C series. The former has been withdrawn in 2002 in favour of adopting the international standard as DIN EN ISO 216, but part 2 has been retained and was last updated in 2008.

The first and the second editions of DIN 476 from 1922 and 1925 also included a D series.

DIN D series paper sizes in portrait view (with rounded inch values)
Format	D series	
Size	mm × mm	inch × inch
0	771 × 1090	30 3/8 × 42 11/12
1	545 × 771	21 11/24 × 30 3/8
2	385 × 545	15 1/6 × 21 11/24
3	272 × 385	10 17/24 × 15 1/6
4	192 × 272	7 13/24 × 10 17/24
5	136 × 192	5 3/8 × 7 13/24
6	96 × 136	3 19/24 × 5 3/8
7	68 × 96	2 2/3 × 3 19/24
8	48 × 68	1 7/8 × 2 2/3

The smallest formats in the original specifications for each series were A13, B13, C8, and D8. Sizes A11 through A13 were no longer listed in the 1930 edition, nor were B11 through B13. C9 and C10 were added in the 1976 revision for compatibility with photography sizes: C8 closely matches 6×9 photos, and C9 and C10 closely match 7×7 and 5×5 slides, respectively.

DIN 476:1922 tiny formats (with rounded inch values)
Format	A		B	
Size	mm × mm	inch × inch	mm × mm	inch × inch
11	18 × 26	17/24 × 1 1/24	22 × 31	7/8 × 1 5/24
12	13 × 18	1/2 × 17/24	15 × 22	7/12 × 7/8
13	9 × 13	3/8 × 1/2	11 × 15	5/12 × 7/12

DIN 476 provides for formats larger than A0, denoted by a prefix factor. In particular, it lists the formats 2A0 and 4A0, which are twice and four times the size of A0 respectively. However, ISO 216:2007 notes 2A0 and 4A0 in the table of Main series of trimmed sizes (ISO A series) as well: "The rarely used sizes [2A0 and 4A0] which follow also belong to this series."

DIN 476 overformats (with rounded inch values)
Name	mm × mm	inch × inch
4A0	1682 × 2378	66 5/24 × 93 5/8
2A0	1189 × 1682	46 19/24 × 66 5/24

DIN 476 also used to specify slightly tighter tolerances than ISO 216:

- ±1 mm (0.039 in) for dimensions up to 150 mm (5.9 in),
- ±1.5 mm (0.059 in) for lengths in the range 150 to 600 mm (5.9 to 23.6 in) and
- ±2 mm (0.079 in) for any dimension above 600 mm (24 in).

There used to be a standard, DIN 198, that was just a table of recommended A series formats for a number of business applications. The 1976 edition of this standard introduced a size 2/3 A4 198 mm × 210 mm and suggested it for some forms and slips.

==== Swedish extensions ====
Comparison of ISO 216 and Swedish standard SIS 014711 paper sizes between A4 and A3 sizes

The Swedish standard SIS 01 47 11 generalized the ISO system of A, B, and C formats by adding D, E, F, and G formats to it. Its D format sits between a B format and the next larger A format (just like C sits between A and the next larger B). The remaining formats fit in between all these formats, such that the sequence of formats A4, E4, C4, G4, B4, F4, D4, *H4, A3 is a geometric progression, in which the dimensions grow by a factor $\sqrt[16]{2}$ from one size to the next. However, this SIS standard does not define any size between a D format and the next larger A format (called *H in the previous example).

Of these additional formats, G5 (169 × 239 mm) and E5 (155 × 220 mm) are popular in Sweden and the Netherlands for printing dissertations, but the other formats have not turned out to be particularly useful in practice. They have not been adopted internationally and the Swedish standard has been withdrawn.

The Swedish and German D series basically contain the same sizes but are offset by one, i.e. DIN D4 equals SIS D5 and so on.

SIS 014711 formulas, including the missing step, series *H, between D and A, $n = 0..10, r = \sqrt[16]{2}, s = \sqrt{\frac{1}{2}}$
Designation	Shorter edge	Longer edge
An	r^{−4} × s^{n}	r^{+4} × s^{n}
En	r^{−3} × s^{n}	r^{+5} × s^{n}
Cn	r^{−2} × s^{n}	r^{+6} × s^{n}
Gn	r^{−1} × s^{n}	r^{+7} × s^{n}
Bn	r^{0} × s^{n}	r^{+8} × s^{n}
Fn	r^{+1} × s^{n}	r^{+9} × s^{n}
Dn	r^{+2} × s^{n}	r^{+10} × s^{n}
*Hn	r^{+3} × s^{n}	r^{+11} × s^{n}
A(n-1)	r^{+4} × s^{n}	r^{+12} × s^{n}

Swedish D, E, F and G series (mm × mm)
n	E	G	F	D
0	878 × 1242	958 × 1354	1044 × 1477	1091 × 1542
1	621 × 878	677 × 958	738 × 1044	771 × 1091
2	439 × 621	479 × 677	522 × 738	545 × 771
3	310 × 439	339 × 479	369 × 522	386 × 545
4	220 × 310	239 × 339	261 × 369	273 × 386
5	155 × 220	169 × 239	185 × 261	193 × 273
6	110 × 155	120 × 169	131 × 185	136 × 193
7	78 × 110	85 × 120	92 × 131	96 × 136
8	55 × 78	60 × 85	65 × 92	68 × 96
9	39 × 55	42 × 60	46 × 65	48 × 68
10	27 × 39	30 × 42	33 × 46	34 × 48

==== Japanese variation ====
The Japanese standard JIS P 0138 defines two main series of paper sizes. The JIS A-series is identical to the ISO A-series except that it has slightly different tolerances. The area of B-series paper is 1.5 times that of the corresponding A-paper (instead of the factor $\sqrt{2} = 1.414...$ for the ISO B-series), so the length ratio is approximately 1.22 times the length of the corresponding A-series paper. The aspect ratio of the paper is the same as for the A-series paper. Both A- and B-series paper are widely available in Japan, Taiwan and China, and most photocopiers are loaded with at least A4 and either one of A3, B4, and B5 paper.

Cascading Style Sheets (CSS) only supports the most popular of the Japanese sizes, JIS-B4 and JIS-B5.

JIS B series paper sizes (with rounded inch values)
Size	mm × mm	inch × inch
0	1030 × 1456	40 13/24 × 57 1/3
1	728 × 1030	28 2/3 × 40 13/24
2	515 × 728	20 7/24 × 28 2/3
3	364 × 515	14 1/3 × 20 7/24
4	257 × 364	10 1/8 × 14 1/3
5	182 × 257	7 1/6 × 10 1/8
6	128 × 182	5 1/24 × 7 1/6
7	91 × 128	3 7/12 × 5 1/24
8	64 × 91	2 1/2 × 3 7/12
9	45 × 64	1 19/24 × 2 1/2
10	32 × 45	1 1/4 × 1 19/24
11	22 × 32	7/8 × 1 1/4
12	16 × 22	5/8 × 7/8

JIS P 0202 raw sizes (with rounded inch values)
Size	mm × mm	inch × inch	AR	sun × sun
A (列本判)	625 × 880	24 5/8 × 34 5/8	√2∶1	20.6 × 29
B (列本判)	765 × 1085	30 1/8 × 42 17/24	√2∶1	25.25 × 35.8
Shiroku-ban (四六判) (4-6)	788 × 1091	31 1/24 × 42 23/24	1.38	26 × 36
Kiku-ban (菊判, Chrysanthemum)	636 × 939	25 1/24 × 36 23/24	1.48	21 × 31
Hattron (ハトロン判)	900 × 1200	35 5/12 × 47 1/4	4∶3	29.7 × 39.6

A popular size for books, dubbed AB, combines the shorter edges of A4 and B4. Another two with an aspect ratio approximating 16:9 are 20% narrower variants of A6 and B6, respectively, the latter resulting from cutting JIS B1 into 4 × 10 sheets (thus "B40").

There are also a number of traditional paper sizes, which are now used mostly by printers. The most common of these old series is the Shiroku-ban and the Kiku paper sizes.

Other Japanese paper sizes (with rounded inch values)
Size	mm × mm	inch × inch	AR	sun × sun	Notes
AB	210 × 257	8 1/4 × 10 1/8	11∶9	6.93 × 8.48	A4/A5 × JIS B4/B5
B40 (新書判, Shinsho-ban)	103 × 182	4 1/24 × 7 1/6	16∶9	3.4 × 6	JIS B1 height/10 × width/4
35	84 × 148	3 7/24 × 5 5/6	1.76	2.77 × 4.88	Trimmed 3 × 5
Kiku-ban	227 × 304	8 11/12 × 11 23/24	1.34	7.5 × 10	
Kiku-ban	218 × 304	8 7/12 × 11 23/24	1.39	7.2 × 10	
Kiku-ban	152 × 227	6 × 8 11/12	1.49	5 × 7.5	
Kiku-ban	152 × 218	6 × 8 7/12	10∶7	5 × 7.2	

==== Chinese extensions ====
The Chinese standard GB/T 148–1997, which replaced GB 148–1989, documents the standard ISO series, A and B, but adds a custom D series. This Chinese format originates from the Republic of China (1912–1949). The D series is not identical to the German or Swedish D series. It does not strictly follow the same principles as ISO paper sizes: The aspect ratio is only very roughly $\sqrt{2}$. The short side of the size is always 4 mm longer than the long side of the next smaller size. The long side of the size is always exactly – i.e. without further rounding – twice as long as the short side of the next smaller size.

SAC D series (with rounded inch values and raw sizes)
Format	D series		AR	Alias	Untrimmed sizes	
Size	mm × mm	inch × inch	AR	Alias	mm × mm	inch × inch
0	764 × 1064	30 1/12 × 41 7/8	1.3927	1K	780 × 1080	30 17/24 × 42 1/2
1	532 × 760	20 23/24 × 29 11/12	1.4286	2K	540 × 780	21 1/4 × 30 17/24
2	380 × 528	14 23/24 × 20 19/24	1.3895	4K	390 × 540	15 3/8 × 21 1/4
3	264 × 376	10 3/8 × 14 19/24	1.4̅2̅4̅2̅	8K	270 × 390	10 5/8 × 15 3/8
4	188 × 260	7 5/12 × 10 1/4	1.3830	16K	195 × 270	7 2/3 × 10 5/8
5	130 × 184	5 1/8 × 7 1/4	1.4154	32K	135 × 195	5 1/3 × 7 2/3
6	92 × 126	3 5/8 × 4 23/24	1.3696	64K	97 × 135	3 5/6 × 5 1/3

Another Chinese standard, GB/T 788-1999, specifies a “B” series slightly smaller than their ISO counterparts, by treating the original definition (actually equivalent to Pliego in Latin America described below) as the untrimmed size. It is not widely used beyond a small fraction of books, and the B-series printing paper on Chinese market defaults to the JIS definition.

SAC B series (with rounded inch values and raw sizes)
Name	Trimmed sizes		AR	Untrimmed sizes	
Name	mm × mm	inch × inch	AR	mm × mm	inch × inch
B5	169 × 239	6 2/3 × 9 5/12	1.4142	175 × 250	6 7/8 × 9 5/6
B6	119 × 165	4 2/3 × 6 1/2	1.3866	125 × 175	4 11/12 × 6 7/8
B7	82 × 115	3 5/24 × 4 13/24	1.4024	87 × 125	3 5/12 × 4 11/12

==== Indian variants ====
The Bureau of Indian Standards recommends the "ISO-A series" size of drawing sheet for engineering drawing works. The Bureau of Indian Standards specifies all the recommendations for engineering drawing sheets in its bulletin IS 10711: 2001.

The Bureau extended the ISO-A series with a Special Elongated Sizes (Second Choice). These sizes are achieved by increasing the shorter dimensions of a sheet of the ISO A series to lengths that are multiples of the shorter dimensions of the chosen basic sheet; in effect, all of the Indian elongated sizes emulate having several regular-size sheets joined on their long edge.

IS Special Elongated Sizes (Second Choice) with rounded inch values
Size	mm × mm	in × in	AR	ISO 5457
A3 x 3	420 × 891	16 13/24 × 35 1/12	3∶√2	—N/a
A3 x 4	420 × 1189	16 13/24 × 46 19/24	4∶√2	A2.0
A4 x 3	297 × 630	11 17/24 × 24 19/24	3∶√2	—N/a
A4 x 4	297 × 841	11 17/24 × 33 1/8	4∶√2	A3.1
A4 x 5	297 × 1051	11 17/24 × 41 3/8	5∶√2	—N/a

There is also a Exceptional Elongated Sizes (Third Choice). These sizes are obtained by increasing the shorter dimensions of a sheet of the ISO-A series to lengths that are multiples of the shorter dimensions of the chosen basic sheet. These sizes are used when a very large or extra elongated sheet is needed.

IS Exceptional Elongated Sizes (Third Choice) with rounded inch values
Size	mm × mm	in × in	AR
A0 x 2	1189 × 1682	46 19/24 × 66 5/24	√2∶1
A0 x 3	1189 × 2523	46 19/24 × 99 1/3	3∶√2
A1 x 3	841 × 1783	33 1/8 × 70 5/24	3∶√2
A1 x 4	841 × 2378	33 1/8 × 93 5/8	4∶√2
A2 x 3	594 × 1261	23 3/8 × 49 5/8	3∶√2
A2 x 4	594 × 1682	23 3/8 × 66 5/24	4∶√2
A2 x 5	594 × 2102	23 3/8 × 82 3/4	5∶√2
A3 x 5	420 × 1486	16 13/24 × 58 1/2	5∶√2
A3 x 6	420 × 1783	16 13/24 × 70 5/24	6∶√2
A3 x 7	420 × 2080	16 13/24 × 81 7/8	7∶√2
A4 x 6	297 × 1261	11 17/24 × 49 5/8	6∶√2
A4 x 7	297 × 1471	11 17/24 × 57 11/12	7∶√2
A4 x 8	297 × 1682	11 17/24 × 66 5/24	8∶√2
A4 x 9	297 × 1892	11 17/24 × 74 1/2	9∶√2

==== Soviet variants ====
The first standard of paper size in the Soviet Union was OST 303 in 1926. Six years later, it was replaced by OST 5115 which generally followed DIN 476 principles, but used Cyrillic lowercase letters instead of Latin uppercase, had the second row shifted so that б_{0} (B0) roughly corresponded to B1 and, more importantly, had slightly different sizes:

OST 5115 formats (1932)
Format	а (A)		б (B)		в (V, C)	
Size	mm × mm	inch × inch	mm × mm	inch × inch	mm × mm	inch × inch
0	814 × 1152	32 1/24 × 45 3/8	747 × 1056	29 5/12 × 41 7/12		
1	576 × 814	22 2/3 × 32 1/24	528 × 747	20 19/24 × 29 5/12	628 × 888	24 17/24 × 34 23/24
2	407 × 576	16 1/24 × 22 2/3	373 × 528	14 2/3 × 20 19/24	444 × 628	17 1/2 × 24 17/24
3	288 × 407	11 1/3 × 16 1/24	264 × 373	10 3/8 × 14 2/3	314 × 444	12 3/8 × 17 1/2
4	203 × 288	8 × 11 1/3	186 × 264	7 1/3 × 10 3/8	222 × 314	8 3/4 × 12 3/8
5	144 × 203	5 2/3 × 8	132 × 186	5 5/24 × 7 1/3	157 × 222	6 1/6 × 8 3/4
6	101 × 144	3 23/24 × 5 2/3	93 × 132	3 2/3 × 5 5/24	111 × 157	4 3/8 × 6 1/6
7	72 × 101	2 5/6 × 3 23/24	66 × 93	2 7/12 × 3 2/3	78 × 111	3 1/12 × 4 3/8
8	50 × 72	1 23/24 × 2 5/6	46 × 66	1 19/24 × 2 7/12	55 × 78	2 1/6 × 3 1/12
9	36 × 50	1 5/12 × 1 23/24	33 × 46	1 7/24 × 1 19/24	39 × 55	1 13/24 × 2 1/6
10	25 × 36	1 × 1 5/12	23 × 33	11/12 × 1 7/24		
11	18 × 25	17/24 × 1	16 × 23	5/8 × 11/12		
12	12 × 18	11/24 × 17/24	11 × 16	5/12 × 5/8		
13	9 × 12	3/8 × 11/24				

The general adaptation of ISO 216 in the Soviet Union, which replaced OST 5115, was GOST 9327. In its 1960 version, it lists formats down to A13, B12 and C8 and also specifies 1/2, 1/4 and 1/8 prefixes for halving the shorter side (repeatedly) for stripe formats, e.g. 1/2A4 = 105 mm × 297 mm.

A1, A2, A3, A4 and non-ISO sizes as GOST 3450-60 formats

A standard for technical drawings from 1960, GOST 3450, introduces alternative numeric format designations to deal with very high or very wide sheets. These 2-digit codes are based upon A4 = "11": The first digit is the factor the longer side (297 mm) is multiplied by and the second digit is the one for the shorter side (210 mm), so "24" is 2×297 mm × 4×210 mm = 594 mm × 840 mm.

Soviet formats with multiplied shorter side (mm×mm)
n	GOST 3450	A…(×1)	A…×2	A…×3	A…×4	A…×5	A…×6
5	4·…	A0	= 2A0	2523 × 1189	3364 × 1189	4204 × 1189	5045 × 1189
4	…·4	A1	= A0	1784 × 841	2378 × 841	2973 × 841	3568 × 841
3	2·…	A2	= A1	1261 × 595	1682 × 595	2102 × 595	2523 × 595
2	…·2	A3	= A2	892 × 420	1189 × 420	1487 × 420	1784 × 420
1	1·…	A4	= A3	631 × 297	841 × 297	1051 × 297	1261 × 297
0	…·1	A5	= A4	446 × 210	595 × 210	743 × 210	892 × 210

A2, A3, A4 and some derived non-ISO sizes as GOST 2301-68 formats

GOST 3450 from 1960 was replaced by ESKD GOST 2301 in 1968, but the numeric designations remained in popular use much longer. The new designations were not purely numeric but consisted of the ISO label followed by an 'x', or possibly the multiplication sign '×', and the factor, e.g. DIN 2A0 = GOST A0×2 = OST 4·8, but DIN 4A0 ≠ GOST A0×4. Also explicitly listed are: A0×3, A1×3, A1×4, A2×3–A2×5, A3×3–A3×7, A4×3–A4×9. The formats …×1 and …×2 are effectively aliases for existing ISO 216 formats. Some …×4 sizes have equivalents in ISO 5457: A3×4 is A2.0 and A4×4 is A3.1.

=== Elongated sizes ===
ISO 5457, last updated in 1999, introduces elongated sizes that are formed by a combination of the dimensions of the short side of an A-size (e.g. A2) with the dimensions of the long side of another larger A-size (e.g. A0). The result is a new size, for example with the abbreviation A2.0 we would have a 420 × 1189 mm size.

Elongated paper sizes schema

ISO 5457 elongated paper sizes
Size	Short edge	Long edge	mm × mm	in × in	AR
A1.0	A1/A2	A0	594 × 1189	23 3/8 × 46 19/24	2∶1
A2.0	A2/A3	A0	420 × 1189	16 13/24 × 46 19/24	4∶√2
A2.1	A2/A3	A1/A0	420 × 841	16 13/24 × 33 1/8	2∶1
A3.0	A3/A4	A0	297 × 1189	11 17/24 × 46 19/24	4∶1
A3.1	A3/A4	A1/A0	297 × 841	11 17/24 × 33 1/8	4∶√2
A3.2	A3/A4	A2/A1	297 × 594	11 17/24 × 23 3/8	2∶1

These drawing paper sizes have been adopted by ANSI/ASME Y14.1M for use in the United States, alongside A0 through A4 and alongside inch-based sizes.

=== International envelope and insert sizes ===
Common folded or cut sizes of ISO paper: stripe formats and inserts
Name	mm × mm	inch × inch	AR	Notes
1/3A4	99 × 210	3 11/12 × 8 1/4	3∶√2	common flyer or stripe size
unnamed	105 × 210	4 1/8 × 8 1/4	2∶1	standard folded size of German letters

DIN 5008 Form A

DIN 5008 (previously DIN 676) prescribes, among many other things, two variants, A and B, for the location of the address field on the first page of a business letter and how to fold the A4 sheet accordingly, so the only part visible of the main content is the subject line.

Common envelopes for ISO paper, that are not simple C-series and B-series formats
Name	mm × mm	inch × inch	AR	Content	Notes
DL	110 × 220	4 1/3 × 8 2/3	2∶1	1/3A4, DIN 5008 A and B	Designated long, "DIN lang" (DIN long); sometimes erroneously instead called "DLE", apparently for envelope; exactly matches Swedish SIS E6/E5 (E6: 110 mm × 155 mm, E5: 155 mm × 220 mm); envelope #5 in China, Chou/N 6 in Japan; fits well enclosed in C6/C5 for the purpose of e.g. reply mail
C6/C5	114 × 229	4 1/2 × 9	2∶1	1/3A4, DIN 5008 A and B	Common edge of C6 and C5 is 161 mm; also known as "Postfix", "DL+" or "DL Max", but those terms are not standardized
Italian	110 × 230	4 1/3 × 9 1/24	2.10∶1	1/3A4, DIN 5008 A and B	Centimetre-rounded C6/C5 or slightly wider DL
C7/C6	81 × 162	3 5/24 × 6 3/8	2∶1	1/3A5	Common edge of C7 and C6 is 114 mm
B6/C4	125 × 324	4 11/12 × 12 3/4	2.6		B6 is 125 mm × 176 mm, C4 is 229 mm × 324 mm
Invite	220 × 220	8 2/3 × 8 2/3	1∶1	Square card with edge of A4 and A5, 210 mm	
DIN E4	280 × 400	11 1/24 × 15 3/4	10∶7		Listed in DIN 678–1, but not part of a series proper; SIS E4 is 220 mm × 310 mm

=== International raw sizes ===
ISO 217 raw and ISO 5457 untrimmed sheet sizes
Raw	mm × mm	inch × inch	Special raw	mm × mm	inch × inch	Untrimmed	mm × mm	inch × inch	Trimmed	mm × mm	inch × inch	mm × mm	inch × inch
RA0	860 × 1220	33 3/4 × 48	SRA0	900 × 1280	35 1/2 × 50 1/2	A0U	880 × 1230	34 3/4 × 48 1/2	A0T	841 × 1189	33 × 46 3/4	821 × 1159	32 1/4 × 45 3/4
RA1	610 × 860	24 × 33 3/4	SRA1	640 × 900	25 1/4 × 35 1/2	A1U	625 × 880	24 1/2 × 34 3/4	A1T	594 × 841	23 1/2 × 33	574 × 811	22 1/2 × 32
RA2	430 × 610	17 × 24	SRA2	450 × 640	17 3/4 × 25 1/4	A2U	450 × 625	17 3/4 × 24 1/2	A2T	420 × 594	16 1/2 × 23 1/2	400 × 564	15 3/4 × 22 1/4
RA3	305 × 430	12 × 17	SRA3	320 × 450	12 1/2 × 17 3/4	A3U	330 × 450	13 × 17 3/4	A3T	297 × 420	11 3/4 × 16 1/2	277 × 390	11 × 15 1/4
RA4	215 × 305	8 1/2 × 12	SRA4	225 × 320	8 3/4 × 12 1/2	A4U	240 × 330	9 1/2 × 13	A4T	210 × 297	8 1/4 × 11 3/4	180 × 277	7 × 11

ISO 5457 specifies drawing paper sizes with a trimmed size equal to the A series sizes from A4 upward. The untrimmed sizes are 3 to 4 cm larger and rounded to the nearest centimetre. A0 through A3 are used in landscape orientation, while A4 is used in portrait orientation. Designations for pre-printed drawing paper include the base sizes and a suffix, either T for trimmed or U for untrimmed sheets.

The withdrawn standard ISO 2784 did specify sizes of continuous, fan-fold forms based upon whole inches as was common for paper in continuous lengths in automatic data processing (ADP) equipment. Specifically, 12 inches (300 mm) was considered an untrimmed variant of the A4 height of 297 mm.

ISO 2784:1974 correspondence for continuous ADP paper
Size	Acceptable equivalent			Direct equivalent			Exact size	Gross size	
Size	inch × inch	mm × mm	AR	inch × inch	mm × mm	AR	mm × mm	mm × mm	inch × inch
A4	8 × 12	203.2 × 304.8	3∶2	8 1/3 × 11 2/3	211.7 × 296.3	7∶5	210 × 297	250 × 340	9 4/5 × 13 2/5
A5	6 × 8	152.4 × 203.2	4∶3	5 5/6 × 8 1/3	148.2 × 211.7	10∶7	148 × 210	180 × 250	7 1/10 × 9 4/5
A6	4 × 6	101.6 × 152.4	3∶2	4 1/6 × 5 5/6	105.8 × 148.2	7∶5	105 × 148	—N/a	—N/a
A7	3 × 4	76.20 × 101.6	4∶3	—N/a	—N/a	—N/a	74 × 105	—N/a	—N/a

== Transitional paper sizes ==
=== PA4 or L4 ===
Hypothetical PA4-based series
Name	mm × mm	inch × inch	AR
PA0	840 × 1120	33 1/8 × 44 1/8	4∶3
PA1	560 × 840	22 × 33 1/8	3∶2
PA2	420 × 560	16 1/2 × 22	4∶3
PA3	280 × 420	11 × 16 1/2	3∶2
PA4	210 × 280	8 1/4 × 11	4∶3
PA5	140 × 210	5 1/2 × 8 1/4	3∶2
PA6	105 × 140	4 1/8 × 5 1/2	4∶3
PA7	70 × 105	2 3/4 × 4 1/8	3∶2
PA8	52 × 70	2 × 2 3/4	1.35
PA9	35 × 52	1 3/8 × 2	1.49
PA10	26 × 35	1 × 1 3/8	1.35

A transitional size called PA4 (210 mm × 280 mm or 8.27 in × 11.02 in), sometimes dubbed L4, was proposed for inclusion into the ISO 216 standard in 1975. It has the height of Canadian P4 paper (215 mm × 280 mm, about 8 1/2 in × 11 in) and the width of international A4 paper (210 mm × 297 mm or 8.27 in × 11.69 in), i.e. it uses the smaller value among the two for each side. The table shows how this format can be generalized into an entire format series.

The PA formats did not end up in ISO 216, because the committee decided that the set of standardized paper formats should be kept to the minimum necessary. However, PA4 remains of practical use today. In landscape orientation, it has the same 4:3 aspect ratio as the displays of traditional TV sets, some computer displays (e.g. the iPad) and data projectors. PA4, with appropriate margins is, therefore, a good choice as the format of presentation slides.

As a compromise between the two most popular paper sizes globally, PA4 is used today by many international magazines, because it can be printed easily on equipment designed for either A4 or US Letter. That means (in practice) it has turned out to be not so much a paper size as a page format. Apple, for instance, requires this format for digital music album booklets.

The size 210 mm × 280 mm was documented in the Canadian standard CAN2-200.2-M79 "Common Image Area for Paper Sizes P4 and A4".

=== F4 ===
Hypothetical F4-based series
Name	mm × mm	inch × inch	AR
F0	841 × 1321	33 1/8 × 52	1.57
F1	660 × 841	26 × 33 1/8	1.27
F2	420 × 660	16 1/2 × 26	1.57
F3	330 × 420	13 × 16 1/2	1.27
F4	210 × 330	8 1/4 × 13	1.57
F5	165 × 210	6 1/2 × 8 1/4	1.27
F6	105 × 165	4 1/8 × 6 1/2	1.57
F7	82 × 105	3 1/4 × 4 1/8	32∶25
F8	52 × 82	2 × 3 1/4	1.58
F9	41 × 52	1 5/8 × 2	1.27
F10	26 × 41	1 × 1 5/8	1.58

A non-standard F4 paper size is common in Southeast Asia. It is a transitional size with the shorter side of ISO A4 (210 mm, 8 1/4 inch) and the longer side of British Foolscap (13-inch (330 mm). ISO A4 is exactly 90% the height of F4. This size is sometimes also known as (metric) 'foolscap' or 'folio'.

In Indonesia, where F4 is the legally-mandated paper size for use in the printing of national legislation, it is sometimes called Folio or HVS (from Dutch: houtvrij schrijfpapier, "wood-free writing paper").

A sheet of F4 can be cut from a sheet of SRA4 with very little wastage. The size is also smaller than its Swedish equivalent SIS F4 at 239 mm × 338 mm.

In some countries, the narrow side of F4 is slightly broader: 8.5 inches (216 mm) or 215 mm. It is then equivalent to the US Government Legal and Foolscap Folio sizes. In India, an amendment to the national standard IS 1064 from 2022 records two metricated, originally inch-based sizes: FS at 215 mm × 345 mm (8.46 in × 13.58 in) and Legal with the same width and a height of either 335 millimetres (13.2 in) or 355 millimetres (14.0 in), i.e. 1 cm less or more than FS. Due to their predominant use, printer manufacturers and vendors have dubbed these sizes Indian Legal or Legal (India). In Mexico, the length of a similar size, likewise known as Mexican Legal or Legal (Mexico), has been rounded to 340 mm.

=== Weltformat ===
The Weltformat ('world format') was developed by German chemist Wilhelm Ostwald in 1911 as part of Die Brücke, around the same time DIN 476 was first discussed. It shares the same design primitives, especially the aspect ratio, but is based upon 1 cm as the short edge of the smallest size. Sizes were designated by roman numerals. The result, for the fourth through fourteenth size, is close to the DIN/ISO C series.

Original world format sizes with equivalent C-series format
Weltformat	mm × mm	inch × inch	DIN
I	10 × 14	3/8 × 1/2	
II	14 × 20	1/2 × 3/4	
III	20 × 28	3/4 × 1 1/8	
IV	28 × 40	1 1/8 × 1 5/8	C10
V	40 × 57	1 5/8 × 2 1/4	C9
VI	57 × 80	2 1/4 × 3 1/8	C8
VII	80 × 113	3 1/8 × 4 1/2	C7
VIII	113 × 160	4 1/2 × 6 1/4	C6
IX	160 × 226	6 1/4 × 8 7/8	C5
X	226 × 320	8 7/8 × 12 5/8	C4
XI	320 × 453	12 5/8 × 17 7/8	C3
XII	453 × 640	17 7/8 × 25 1/4	C2
XIII	640 × 905	25 1/4 × 35 5/8	C1
XIV	905 × 1280	35 5/8 × 50 3/8	C0
XV	1280 × 1810	50 3/8 × 71 1/4	
XVI	1810 × 2560	71 1/4 × 100 3/4	

The sizes have been used for some print products in the early 20th century in central Europe but got replaced by DIN sizes almost entirely. However, it was successfully adopted from 1913 onwards for posters and placards in Switzerland. Even today, the default size for posters in Swiss advertisements, F4, is colloquially known as Weltformat, although it measures 895 mm × 1280 mm, i.e. 1 cm less than size XIV. This poster size goes alongside F12 Breitformat 2685 mm × 1280 mm (3 × F4) and F24 Großformat 2685 mm × 2560 mm (2 × 3 × F4), as well as F200 "Cityformat" 1165 mm × 1700 mm.

=== A0a ===
Though many countries have moved towards adopting ISO metric paper sizes, the transition towards this has led to at least one new paper size that differs slightly to those used internationally. British architects and industrial designers once used a size called "Antiquarian", 31 in × 53 in (787 mm × 1,346 mm), as listed above, but given in the New Metric Handbook (Tutt & Adler 1981) as 813 mm × 1,372 mm (32 in × 54 in) for board size. This size is a little larger than ISO A0 (841 mm x 1189 mm), and for a short time, a size called A0a of 1,000 by 1,370 millimetres (39.4 in × 53.9 in) was used in Britain, which was in reality a slightly shorter version of ISO B0 (1414 mm).

=== Pliego ===
Colombian metric paper sizes
Size	mm × mm	inch × inch	AR
Pliego	700 × 1000	27 1/2 × 39 1/4	10∶7
1/2 pliego	500 × 700	19 3/4 × 27 1/2	7∶5
1/4 pliego	350 × 500	13 3/4 × 19 3/4	10∶7
1/8 pliego	250 × 350	9 3/4 × 13 3/4	7∶5

The most common paper sizes used for commercial and industrial printing in Colombia are based upon a size referred to as pliego that is ISO B1 (707 mm × 1000 mm) cut to full decimetres. Smaller sizes are derived by halving, and are indicated by a vulgar fraction prefix, such as 1/2 pliego and 1/4 pliego.

=== K ===
In East Asia – Japan, Taiwan, and China in particular – there are a number of similar paper sizes in common use for book-making and other purposes. A single designation is often used with slightly different edge measurements: the base sheet is labelled 1K (or 1开, where K standards for Chinese: 开本; pinyin: kāiběn; lit. 'folio', or 1切/1取 in Japanese); all smaller sizes are derived by halving the power of 2 number, i = 2^{n}, in front of the uppercase letter K. The number in ISO designations, in contrast, is the exponent n that would yield the number of sheets cut from the base sizes.

The sizes of such folios depend on the base sheet. Pre-metric standards include:

- The imperial kiku-ban (菊判), named after the Chrysanthemum watermark on imperial paper, measuring 636 mm × 939 mm.
- The four-by-six shiroku-ban (四六判) (4×6 or 4/6), where the final size at 32K was measured 4 by 6 sun in Japan, roughly 121 × 181 mm, or slightly more, 127 or 130 × 188 mm i.e. 4.2 or 4.3 × 6.2 sun.
  - In Taiwan, the traditional base size 1K inherited from Japan is sometimes quoted as measuring 31 × 43 inches exactly, which is off by roughly 1 millimetre from the commonly quoted metric base size of 788 × 1091 mm, which is directly derived from 26 × 36 sun or 2.6 × 3.6 shaku.
- The three-by-five 三五判 (3×5 or 3/5), where the final size at 32K is slightly less than 3 by 5 sun, often given as 84 × 148 mm which would be approximately 2.8 × 4.9 sun.

The 4/6 standard has given rise to newer metric book-size standards, including:

- The modern Japanese size for books, simply labelled B and is specified as 765 × 1085 millimetres. It is not directly related to the similar JIS B series, where B1 is slightly smaller.
- The Chinese SAC D series.

Traditional East-Asian Kai or 2^{n}K paper sizes with comparable modern sizes, all in (mm × mm)
	4/6		Taiwanese finishes (trimmed 4/6)		Japan Kai	Japanese finishes		JIS B	JIS P 0138		SAC		
	Shaku-based	Inch-based	Taiwanese finishes (trimmed 4/6)		Japan Kai	Japanese finishes		JIS B	JIS P 0138			Trimmed	Untrimmed
1K	788 × 1091	787 × 1092	758 × 1060	760 × 1040	—N/a	—N/a	—N/a	765 × 1085	B1	728 × 1030	D0	764 × 1064	780 × 1080
2K	545 × 788	546 × 787	530 × 758	520 × 760	—N/a	—N/a	—N/a	(542 × 765)	B2	515 × 728	D1	532 × 760	540 × 780
4K	394 × 545	394 × 546	379 × 530	380 × 520	—N/a	—N/a	—N/a	(382 × 542)	B3	364 × 515	D2	380 × 532	390 × 540
8K	272 × 394	273 × 394	265 × 379	260 × 380	267 × 389	275 × 395	264 × 379	(271 × 382)	B4	257 × 364	D3	264 × 376	270 × 390
16K	197 × 272	197 × 273	189 × 265	190 × 260	—N/a	198 × 275	189 × 262	(191 × 271)	B5	182 × 257	D4	188 × 260	195 × 270
32K	136 × 197	137 × 197	132 × 189	130 × 190	130 × 188	—N/a	127 × 188	(135 × 191)	B6	128 × 182	D5	130 × 184	135 × 195
64K	98 × 136	98 × 137	94 × 132	95 × 130	—N/a	—N/a	—N/a	—N/a	B7	91 × 128	D6	92 × 130	97 × 135
128K	68 × 98		66 × 94	65 × 95	—N/a	—N/a	—N/a	—N/a	B8	64 × 91	—N/a	(65 × 92)	(67 × 97)

== North American paper sizes ==
=== Inch-based loose sizes ===
American loose paper sizes
Size	inch × inch	mm × mm	Aspect ratio
Ledger	17 × 11	432 × 279	0.65
Tabloid Extra	12 × 18	305 × 457	3∶2
European EDP	12 × 14	305 × 356	1.17
Tabloid	11 × 17	279 × 432	1.55
11 × 15	11 × 15	279 × 381	1.36
Fanfold	11 × 14 7/8	279 × 378	1.35
EDP	11 × 14	279 × 356	1.27
11 × 12	11 × 12	279 × 305	12∶11
10 × 14	10 × 14	254 × 356	7∶5
10 × 13	10 × 13	254 × 330	1.3
10 × 11	10 × 11	254 × 279	11∶10
Legal Extra	9 1/2 × 15	241 × 381	1.58
Letter Extra	9 1/2 × 12	241 × 305	1.26
Letter Tab	9 × 11	229 × 279	11∶9
Legal	8 1/2 × 14	216 × 356	1.65
Foolscap Folio	8 1/2 × 13 1/2	216 × 343	1.59
Oficio	8 1/2 × 13 2/5	216 × 340	1.58
Government Legal; Foolscap	8 1/2 × 13	216 × 330	1.53
Letter Plus	8 1/2 × 12 2/3	216 × 322	1.49
European Fanfold	8 1/2 × 12	216 × 305	√2∶1
Letter	8 1/2 × 11	216 × 279	1.29
Quarto	8 1/2 × 10 5/6	216 × 275	1.27
Government Legal (foolscap folio)	8 × 13	203 × 330	1.63
Demitab (Government Letter)	8 × 10 1/2	203 × 267	1.31
Government Letter	8 × 10	203 × 254	5∶4
Executive	7 1/4 × 10 1/2	184 × 267	1.45
7 × 9	7 × 9	178 × 229	1.29
Memo, Statement, Mini, Invoice; Stationery, Half-Letter	5 1/2 × 8 1/2	140 × 216	1.55
Junior Legal	5 × 8	127 × 203	8∶5
5 × 7	5 × 7	127 × 178	7∶5

The United States, Canada, and the Philippines primarily use a different system of paper sizes from the rest of the world. The current standard sizes are unique to those countries, although due to the size of the North American market and proliferation of both software and printing hardware from the region, other parts of the world have become increasingly familiar with these sizes (though not necessarily the paper itself). Some traditional North American inch-based sizes differ from the Imperial British sizes described below.

==== Common American loose sizes ====
Letter, Legal, Ledger, and Tabloid are by far the most commonly used of these for everyday activities, and the only North American paper sizes included in Cascading Style Sheets (CSS).

The origins of the exact dimensions of Letter size paper are lost in tradition and not well documented. The American Forest and Paper Association argues that the dimension originates from the days of manual papermaking and that the 11-inch length of the page is about a quarter of "the average maximum stretch of an experienced vatman's arms." However, this does not explain the width or aspect ratio.

Outside of North America, Letter size may also be known as "American Quarto". If one accepts some trimming, the size is indeed one quarter of the old Imperial paper size known as Demy, 17 1/2 in × 22 1/2 in (444 mm × 572 mm).

Manufacturers of computer printers, however, recognize inch-based Quarto as 10 5/6 or 10.83 in (275 mm) long.

==== Usage and adoption ====
US paper sizes are currently standard in the United States and are the most commonly used formats at least in the Philippines, most of Mesoamerica and Chile. The latter use US Letter, but their Legal size is 13 inches tall (recognized as Foolscap by printer manufacturers), i.e. one inch shorter than its US equivalent.

Mexico and Colombia, for instance, have adopted the ISO standard, but the US Letter format is still the system in use throughout the country. It is rare to encounter ISO standard papers in day-to-day uses, with Carta (letter), oficio (government-legal), and doble carta (ledger/tabloid) being nearly universal. Printer manufacturers, however, recognize oficio as 13.4 in (340 mm) long.

Similarly, the Philippines officially adopted the ISO standard in government offices, even forbidding the use of US Letter formats. However, some government agencies still continue to use the US Letter formats. Likewise, US Letter formats are still widely used in everyday life, and A4 sizes are often more commonly used in specialty papers.

In Canada, some US paper sizes are de facto standard.

==== Variant American loose sizes ====
There is an additional paper size, 8 in × 10 1/2 in (203 mm × 267 mm), to which the name Government-Letter was given by the IEEE Printer Working Group (PWG). It was prescribed by Herbert Hoover when he was Secretary of Commerce to be used for US government forms, apparently to enable discounts from the purchase of paper for schools, but more likely due to the standard use of trimming books (after binding) and paper from the standard letter size paper to produce consistency and allow "bleed" printing. In later years, as photocopy machines proliferated, citizens wanted to make photocopies of the forms, but the machines did not generally have this size of paper in their bins. Ronald Reagan therefore had the US government switch to regular Letter size, which is half an inch both longer and wider. The former government size is still commonly used in spiral-bound notebooks, for children's writing and the like, a result of trimming from the current Letter dimensions.

By extension of the American standards, the halved Letter size, 5 1/2 in × 8 1/2 in (140 mm × 216 mm), meets the needs of many applications. It is variably known as Statement, Stationery, Memo, Half Letter, Half A (from ANSI sizes) or simply Half Size, and as Invoice by printer manufacturers. Like the similar-sized ISO A5, it is used for everything from personal letter writing to official aeronautical maps. Organizers, notepads, and diaries also often use this size of paper; thus ring binders and folders are also available in this size. Booklets of this size are created using word processing tools with landscape printing in two columns on letter paper which are then cut or folded into the final size.

A foot-long sheet with the common width of Letter and (Government) Legal, i.e. 8 1/2 in × 12 in (216 mm × 305 mm), would have an aspect ratio very close to the square root of two as used by international paper sizes and would actually almost exactly match ISO RA4 (215 mm × 305 mm). This size is sometimes known as European Fanfold.

While Executive refers to 7 1/4 in × 10 1/2 in (184 mm × 267 mm) in America, the Japanese organization for standardization specified it as 216 mm × 330 mm (8.5 in × 13.0 in), which is elsewhere known as Government Legal or Foolscap.

==== Standardized American paper sizes ====
A size chart illustrating the ANSI sizes, superimposed on an "ANSI E" sheet

In 1996, the American National Standards Institute adopted ANSI/ASME Y14.1 which defined a regular series of paper sizes based upon the de facto standard 8 1/2 in × 11 in (216 mm × 279 mm) Letter size which it assigned "ANSI A", intended for technical drawings, hence sometimes labelled "Engineering". This series is somewhat similar to the ISO standard in that cutting a sheet in half would produce two sheets of the next smaller size and therefore also includes Ledger/Tabloid as "ANSI B". Unlike the ISO standard, however, the arbitrary base sides forces this series to have two alternating aspect ratios. For example, ANSI A is less elongated than A4, while ANSI B is more elongated than A3.

The Canadian standard CAN2-9.60-M76 and its successor, CAN/CGSB-9.60-94, both titled "Paper Sizes for Correspondence", specified paper sizes P1 through P6, which are the U.S. paper sizes rounded to the nearest 5 mm. All custom Canadian paper size standards were withdrawn in 2012.

With care, documents can be prepared so that the text and images fit on either ANSI or their equivalent ISO sheets at a 1:1 reproduction scale.

ANSI and CAN paper sizes
US size	inch × inch	mm × mm	Aspect ratio	Canadian size (mm × mm)		Similar size (mm × mm)	
—N/a				CAN P6	107 × 140	ISO A6	105 × 148
—N/a				CAN P5	140 × 215	ISO A5	148 × 210
ANSI A	8 1/2 × 11	216 × 279	17:22	CAN P4	215 × 280	ISO A4	210 × 297
ANSI B	11 × 17	279 × 432	11:17	CAN P3	280 × 430	ISO A3	297 × 420
ANSI C	17 × 22	432 × 559	17:22	CAN P2	430 × 560	ISO A2	420 × 594
ANSI D	22 × 34	559 × 864	11:17	CAN P1	560 × 860	ISO A1	594 × 841
ANSI E	34 × 44	864 × 1118	17:22	—N/a		ISO A0	841 × 1187

Other, informal, larger sizes continuing the alphabetic series illustrated above exist, but they are not part of the series per se, because they do not exhibit the same aspect ratios. For example, Engineering F size is 28 in × 40 in or 711 mm × 1,016 mm with approximately 1.4286:1; it is commonly required for NAVFAC drawings, but is generally less commonly used. Engineering G size is 22 1/2 in (572 mm) high, but it is a roll format with a variable width up to 90 in (2.3 m) in increments of 8 1/2 in (216 mm). Engineering H through N sizes are also roll formats.

Such huge sheets were at one time used for full-scale layouts of aircraft parts, automotive parts, wiring harnesses, and the like, but are slowly being phased out, due to widespread use of computer-aided design (CAD) and computer-aided manufacturing (CAM). Some visual arts fields also continue to use these paper formats for large-scale printouts, such as for displaying digitally painted character renderings at life-size as references for makeup artists and costume designers or to provide an immersive landscape reference.

==== Architectural sizes ====
A size chart illustrating the Architectural sizes

In addition to the system as listed above, there is a corresponding series of paper sizes used for architectural purposes defined in the same standard, ANSI/ASME Y14.1, which is usually abbreviated "Arch". This series also shares the property that bisecting each size produces two of the size below, with alternating aspect ratios. It may be preferred by North American architects because the aspect ratios (4:3 and 3:2) are ratios of small integers, unlike their ANSI (or ISO) counterparts. Furthermore, the aspect ratio 4:3 matches the traditional aspect ratio for computer displays.

The size Arch E1 has a different aspect ratio because it derives from adding 6 inches to each side of Arch D or subtracting the same amount from Arch E. Printer manufacturer recognize it as wide-format. An intermediate size between Arch C and D with a long side of 30 inches (760 mm) does not exist.

US architectural standard paper sizes
Names		inch × inch	mm × mm	Aspect ratio
Arch A	Arch 1	9 × 12	229 × 305	4∶3
Arch B	Arch 2	12 × 18	305 × 457	3∶2
Arch C	Arch 3	18 × 24	457 × 610	4∶3
Arch D	Arch 4	24 × 36	610 × 914	3∶2
Arch E1	Arch 5	30 × 42	762 × 1070	7∶5
Arch E2		26 × 38	660 × 965	1.46
Arch E3		27 × 39	686 × 991	13∶9
Arch E	Arch 6	36 × 48	914 × 1220	4∶3

=== Demitab ===
The demitab or demi-tab (a portmanteau of the French word demi ('half') and 'tabloid') is 8 in × 10 1/2 in (203 mm × 267 mm), i.e. roughly one half of a sheet of 11 in × 17 in (279 mm × 432 mm) tabloid-size paper.

"Demitab", "broadsheet" or "tabloid" format newspapers are not necessarily printed on paper measuring exactly their nominal size.

=== Notebook sizes ===
The sizes listed above are for paper sold loose in reams. There are many sizes of tablets of paper, that is, sheets of paper bound at one edge, usually by a strip of plastic or hardened PVA adhesive. Often there is a pad of cardboard (also known as paperboard or greyboard) at the bottom of the stack. Such a tablet serves as a portable writing surface, and the sheets often have lines printed on them, usually in non-repro blue, to make writing in a line easier. An older means of binding is to have the sheets stapled to the cardboard along the top of the tablet; there is a line of perforated holes across every page just below the top edge from which any page may be torn off. Lastly, a pad of sheets each weakly stuck with adhesive to the sheet below, trademarked as "Post-It" or "Stick-Em" and available in various sizes, serve as a sort of tablet.

"Letter pads" are 8 1/2 in × 11 in (216 mm × 279 mm), while the term "legal pad" is often used by laymen to refer to pads of various sizes including those of 8 1/2 in × 14 in (216 mm × 356 mm). Stenographers use "steno pads" of 6 in × 9 in (152 mm × 229 mm). The steno pad size is also used by Scholastic Corporation as the text block size of their hardcover editions of the Harry Potter novels, with paperback editions using DIN D6.

=== Envelope sizes ===
US envelopes
Name	inch × inch	mm × mm	AR
Personal	3 5/8 × 6 1/2	92.1 × 165	1.79
Monarch	3 7/8 × 7 1/2	98.4 × 191	1.94
A2	4 3/8 × 5 3/4	111 × 146	1.31
#9	3 7/8 × 8 7/8	98.4 × 225	2.29
#10, Commercial	4 1/8 × 9 1/2	105 × 241	2.3
#11	4 1/2 × 10 3/8	114 × 264	2.31
#12	4 3/4 × 11	121 × 279	2.32
#14	5 × 11 1/2	127 × 292	2.3

US Postal Service size limitations, height × width × thickness
Mail piece	inch × inch × inch	mm × mm × mm
Minimum	3 1/2 × 5 × 0.009	88.9 × 127 × 0.229
Postcard maximum	4 1/4 × 6 × 0.016	108 × 152 × 0.406
Letter maximum	6 1/8 × 11 1/2 × 1/4	156 × 292 × 6.35
Flat-size maximum	12 × 15 × 3/4	305 × 381 × 19.1

This implies that all postcards have an aspect ratio in the range from 20∶17 = 1.18 to 12∶7 = 1.71, but the machinable aspect ratio is further restricted to a minimum of 1.30. The only ISO 216 size in the US postcard range is A6. The theoretical maximum aspect ratio for enveloped letters is 23∶7 = 3.29, but is explicitly limited to 2.50.

=== Personal organizer sizes ===
US personal organizers
Company	Name	inch × inch	mm × mm	Holes
Filofax	M2	2 1/2 × 4	63.5 × 102	3 holes
Filofax	Mini	(2 5/8 × 4 1/8)	67 × 105	5 holes
Filofax	Pocket	(3 1/6 × 4 3/4)	81 × 120	6 holes
Filofax	Personal, Slimline	(3 3/4 x 6 3/4)	95 × 171	6 holes
Filofax	A5	(5 13/16 × 8 9/32)	148 × 210	6 holes
Filofax	Deskfax (B5)	(6 15/16 × 9 27/32)	176 × 250	9 holes
Filofax	A4	(8 9/32 × 11 11/16)	210 × 297	4 holes
Franklin Planner	Micro (1/8-Letter)	2 5/8 × 4 1/4	66.7 × 108	
Franklin Planner	Pocket	3 1/2 × 6	88.9 × 152	
Franklin Planner	Compact	4 1/4 × 6 3/4	108 × 171	
Franklin Planner	Classic (1/2-Letter)	5 1/2 × 8 1/2	140 × 216	
Franklin Planner	Monarch (Letter)	8 1/2 × 11	216 × 279	
Jeppesen	Aeronautical Chart (1/2-Letter)	5 1/2 × 8 1/2	140 × 216	7 holes; FAA: 3 holes at top

=== Index card sizes ===
US index cards
inch × inch	mm × mm	AR
3 × 5	76.2 × 127	5∶3
4 × 6	102 × 152	3∶2
5 × 8	127 × 203	8∶5
6 × 8	152 × 203	4∶3

=== Photography sizes ===
US photographic paper sizes
Name	inch × inch	mm × mm	AR
2R	2 1/2 × 3 1/2	63.5 × 88.9	7∶5
-	3 × 5	76.2 × 127	5∶3
LD, DSC	3 1/2 × 4 2/3	88.9 × 119	4∶3
3R, L	3 1/2 × 5	88.9 × 127	10∶7
LW	3 1/2 × 5 1/4	88.9 × 133	3∶2
KGD	4 × 5 1/3	102 × 135	4∶3
4R, KG	4 × 6	102 × 152	3∶2
2LD, DSCW	5 × 6 2/3	127 × 169	4∶3
5R, 2L	5 × 7	127 × 178	7∶5
2LW	5 × 7 1/2	127 × 191	3∶2
6R	6 × 8	152 × 203	4∶3
8R, 6P	8 × 10	203 × 254	5∶4
S8R, 6PW	8 × 12	203 × 305	3∶2
11R	11 × 14	279 × 356	1.27
A3+, Super B	13 × 19	330 × 483	1.46

=== Grain ===
Most industry standards express the direction of the grain last when giving dimensions (that is, 17 × 11 inches is short grain paper and 11 × 17 inches is long grain paper), although alternatively the grain alignment can be explicitly indicated with an underline (11 × 17 is a short grain) or the letter "M" for "machine" (11M × 17 is a short grain). Grain is important because the paper will crack if folded across the grain: for example, if a sheet 17 × 11 inches is to be folded to divide the sheet into two 8.5 × 11 halves, then the grain will be along the 11-inch side. Paper intended to be fed into a machine that will bend the paper around rollers, such as a printing press, photocopier or typewriter, should be fed grain edge first so that the axis of the rollers is along the grain.

=== Traditional inch-based paper sizes ===
Traditional and standardized paper formats still relevant in the US

Traditionally, a number of different sizes were defined for large sheets of paper, and paper sizes were defined by the sheet name and the number of times it had been folded. Thus a full sheet of "royal" paper was 25 × 20 inches, and "royal octavo" was this size folded three times, so as to make eight sheets, and was thus 10 × 6 1/4 inches. Royal sizes were used for posters and billboards.

Common divisions and their abbreviations
Name	Abbr.	Folds	Leaves	Pages
Folio	fo, f	1	2	4
Quarto	4to	2	4	8
Sexto, sixmo	6to, 6mo	3	6	12
Octavo	8vo	3	8	16
Duodecimo, twelvemo	12mo	4	12	24
Sextodecimo, sixteenmo	16mo	4	16	32

Imperial sizes were used in the United Kingdom and its territories and some survived in US book printing.

Imperial paper sizes
Name	Variant	inch × inch	mm × mm	AR
Emperor	UK	48 × 72	1220 × 1830	1.5
Quad Royal	US	40 × 50	1020 × 1270	1.25
Quad Demy	US	35 × 45	889 × 1140	1.2857
Antiquarian	UK	31 × 53	787 × 1350	1.7097
Grand Eagle	UK	28 3/4 × 42	730 × 1070	1.4609
Double Elephant	UK	26 3/4 × 40	679 × 1020	1.4984
Atlas	UK	26 × 34	660 × 864	1.3077
Double Royal	US	25 × 40	635 × 1020	1.6
Colombier	UK	23 1/2 × 34 1/2	597 × 876	1.4681
Double Demy	UK	22 1/2 × 35 1/2	572 × 902	1.57̅
Double Demy	US	22 1/2 × 35	572 × 889	1.5̅
Imperial	UK	22 × 30	559 × 762	1.3636
Double Large Post	UK	21 × 33	533 × 838	1.5713
Elephant	both	23 × 28	584 × 711	1.2174
Princess	UK	22 1/2 × 28	572 × 711	1.3023
Cartridge	UK	21 × 26	533 × 660	1.2381
Royal	both	20 × 25	508 × 635	1.25
Sheet, Half Post	UK	19 1/2 × 23 1/2	495 × 597	1.2051
Double Post	UK	19 × 30 1/2	483 × 775	1.6052
Super Royal	UK	19 × 27	483 × 686	1.4203
Broadsheet	US	18 × 24	457 × 610	1.3̅
Medium	UK	17 1/2 × 23	444 × 584	1.2425
Medium	US	18 × 23	457 × 584	1.27̅
Demy	both	17 1/2 × 22 1/2	444 × 572	1.2857
Copy Draught	UK	16 × 20	406 × 508	1.25
Large Post	UK	15 1/2 × 20	394 × 508	1.2903
Large Post	US	16 1/2 × 21	419 × 533	1.2̅7̅
Post	UK	15 1/2 × 19 1/4	394 × 489	1.2419
Post	US	15 1/2 × 19 1/2	394 × 495	1.2581
Crown	both	15 × 20	381 × 508	1.3̅
Pinched Post	UK	14 3/4 × 18 1/2	375 × 470	1.2533
Foolscap	UK	13 × 16	330 × 406	1.2303
Foolscap	US	13 1/2 × 17	343 × 432	1.2595
Foolscap Folio	UK	13 × 8	330 × 203	1.6256
Foolscap Folio	US	13 1/2 × 8 1/2	343 × 216	1.5880
Small Foolscap	UK	13 1/4 × 16 1/2	337 × 419	1.2453
Brief	UK	13 1/2 × 16	343 × 406	1.1852
Pott	UK	12 1/2 × 15	317 × 381	1.2
Quarto	US	9 × 11	229 × 279	1.2̅
Executive, Monarch	US	7 1/4 × 10 1/2	184 × 267	1.4483

== Traditional British paper sizes ==
Traditional British sizes of cut paper, commonly used as stationery paper, are often referred to by the number of sheets that can be cut from a larger sheet of uncut paper. The standard British imperial uncut paper sizes used in offices and schools were "foolscap", "post", and "copy". Each uncut sheet can then be halved into folios, quartered into quartos, or eighthed into octavos.

Traditional British cut‑paper sizes
Albert	3 7/8″ × 6″
Copy octavo	4 5/8″ × 7 1/4″
Copy quarto	7 3/4″ × 9 5/8″
Czarina	4 1/2″ × 6″
Demy octavo	4 3/4″ × 7 1/4″
Demy quarto	7 3/8″ × 9 3/8″
Duchess	4 1/4″ × 6″
Duke	4 3/4″ × 6 3/4″
Emperor	5 1/2″ × 7 1/4″
Empire	4 1/4″ × 6 1/4″
Foolscap folio (commonly shortened to 'foolscap')	8″ × 13″
Foolscap quarto (commonly called 'sixmo')	6 1/2″ × 8″
Large post octavo (commonly shortened to 'octavo')	5″ × 8″
Large post quarto (commonly shortened to 'quarto')	8″ × 10″
Medium octavo	5 3/8″ × 8 3/8″
Medium quarto	8 3/8″ × 10 3/4″
Post octavo	4 1/2″ × 7
Post quarto	7 3/8″ × 9
Prince of Wales	3″ × 4 1/2″
Princeps	4 1/4″ × 5 5/8″
Princess	4 1/8″ × 5 5/8″
Queen	3 1/2″ × 5 3/8″
Regina	4 3/4″ × 6 5/8″
Viscount	5″ × 6 1/2″

A traditional British paper size in the British legal industry is brief (13″ × 16″): this size was used by solicitors to write their briefs (court‑case instructions) for barristers.

Uncut paper, on the other hand, is referred to by names only, not by the number of sheets that can be cut from a larger sheet of paper.

Standardised British uncut–writing paper, uncut–printing paper, and uncut–wrapping paper sizes adopted by British Standards Institute specification number 730 of 1937
Writing paper
Double elephant	27″ × 40″
Double imperial	30″ × 44″
Double large post	21″ × 33″
Double post	19″ × 30″
Double small demy	20″ × 31″
Double small foolscap ('foolscap' is sometimes shortened to ''cap' or 'cap')	16 1/2″ × 26 1/2″
Imperial	22″ × 30″
Large post	16 1/2″ × 21″
Oblong double small foolscap ('foolscap' is sometimes shortened to ''cap' or 'cap')	13 1/4″ × 33″
Post	15″ × 19″
Quad small demy	31″ × 40″
Quad small foolscap ('foolscap' is sometimes shortened to ''cap' or 'cap')	26 1/2″ × 33″
Sheet‑and‑a‑half imperial	22″ × 45″
Sheet‑and‑a‑half small foolscap ('foolscap' is sometimes shortened to ''cap' or 'cap')	13 1/4″ × 24 3/4″
Sheet‑and‑a‑third small foolscap ('foolscap' is sometimes shortened to ''cap' or 'cap')	13 1/4″ × 22″
Small demy	15 1/2″ × 20″
Small foolscap ('foolscap' is sometimes shortened to ''cap' or 'cap')	13 1/4″ × 16 1/2″
Small royal	19″ × 24″
Printing paper
Demy	17 1/2″ × 22 1/2″
Double crown	20″ × 30″
Double demy	22 1/2″ × 35″
Double elephant	27″ × 40″
Double imperial	30″ × 44″
Double foolscap ('foolscap' is sometimes shortened to ''cap' or 'cap')	17″ × 27″
Double large post	21″ × 33″
Double large royal	27″ × 41″
Double medium	23″ × 36″
Double post	19″ × 30″
Double royal	25″ × 40″
Foolscap ('foolscap' is sometimes shortened to ''cap' or 'cap')	13 1/2″ × 17″
Imperial	22″ × 30″
Large post	16 1/2″ × 21″
Large royal	20 1/2″ × 27″
Medium	18″ × 23″
Post	15″ × 19″
Quad crown	30″ × 40″
Quad demy	35″ × 45″
Quad foolscap ('foolscap' is sometimes shortened to ''cap' or 'cap')	27″ × 34″
Royal	20″ × 25″
Sheet‑and‑a‑half foolscap ('foolscap' is sometimes shortened to ''cap' or 'cap')	13 1/2″ × 25 1/2″
Sheet‑and‑a‑half imperial	22″ × 45″
Sheet‑and‑a‑third foolscap ('foolscap' is sometimes shortened to ''cap' or 'cap')	13 1/2″ × 22 1/2″
Wrapping paper
Bag cap	20″ × 24″
Casing (the definition across the island of Great Britain)	36″ × 46″
Casing (the definition across the island of Ireland)	36″ × 48″
Double crown	20″ × 30″
Double double imperial	45″ × 58″
Double imperial	29″ × 45″
Double medium	23″ × 36″
Extra large casing	40″ × 48″
Imperial	22 1/2″ × 29″
Quad crown	30″ × 40″
Saddleback	36″ × 45″

Standardised British uncut–writing paper and uncut–printing paper sizes adopted by the UK paper industry in 1925 (not applicable to paper that is not writing paper or printing paper)
Writing paper
Double imperial	30″ × 44″
Double large post	21″ × 33″
Double small demy	20″ × 31″
Double foolscap ('foolscap' is sometimes shortened to ''cap' or 'cap')	16 1/2″ × 26 1/2″
Double small royal	24″ × 38″
Foolscap ('foolscap' is sometimes shortened to ''cap' or 'cap')	13 1/4″ × 16 1/2″
Imperial	22″ × 30″
Large post	16 1/2″ × 21″
Sheet‑and‑a‑half foolscap ('foolscap' is sometimes shortened to ''cap' or 'cap')	13 1/4″ × 24 3/4″
Sheet‑and‑a‑third foolscap ('foolscap' is sometimes shortened to ''cap' or 'cap')	13 1/4″ × 22″
Small demy	15 1/2″ × 20″
Small medium	17 1/2″ × 22″
Small post	14 1/2″ × 18 1/2″
Small royal	19″ × 24″
Super royal	19″ × 27″
Printing paper	
Crown	15″ × 20″
Demy	17 1/2″ × 22 1/2″
Double crown	20″ × 30″
Double demy	22 1/2″ × 35″
Double imperial	30″ × 44″
Double large foolscap ('foolscap' is sometimes shortened to ''cap' or 'cap')	17″ × 27″
Double large post	21″ × 33″
Double medium	23″ × 36″
Double royal	25″ × 40″
Imperial	22″ × 30″
Large foolscap ('foolscap' is sometimes shortened to ''cap' or 'cap')	13 1/2″ × 17″
Large post	16 1/2″ × 21″
Large royal	20″ × 27″
Medium	18″ × 23″
Quad crown	30″ × 40″
Quad demy	35″ × 45″
Quad large foolscap ('foolscap' is sometimes shortened to ''cap' or 'cap')	27″ × 34″
Quad royal	40″ × 50″
Royal	20″ × 25″
Under the 1925 standardisation scheme, all 'double' and 'quad' sizes were required to be exact multiples of the 'single' sizes.

Standard uncut–writing paper and uncut–printing paper sizes prior to the 1925 standardisation and standard uncut–wrapping paper sizes prior to the 1937 standardisation
Writing paper
Antiquarian	31″ × 53″
Atlas	26″ × 34″
Columbier	23 1/2″ × 34 1/2″
Copy	16 1/2″ × 20″
Demy	15 1/2″ × 20″
Double demy	20″ × 31″
Double elephant	27″ × 40″
Double foolscap ('foolscap' is sometimes shortened to ''cap' or 'cap')	16 1/2″ × 26 1/2″
Double imperial	30″ × 44″
Double large post	21″ × 33″
Double post	19″ × 30 1/2″
Double pott	15″ × 25″
Double royal	24″ × 38″
Elephant	23″ × 28″
Foolscap ('foolscap' is sometimes shortened to ''cap' or 'cap')	13 1/4″ × 16 1/2″
Imperial	22″ × 30″
Large post	16 1/2″ × 21″
Medium	17 1/2″ × 22″
Pinched post	14 3/4″ × 18 1/2″
Post	15 1/4″ ×19″
Pott	12 1/2″ × 15″
Royal	19″ × 24″
Sheet‑and‑a‑half foolscap ('foolscap' is sometimes shortened to ''cap' or 'cap')	13 1/4″ × 24 1/2″
Super royal	19 1/4″ × 27″
Printing paper
Copy	16 1/2″ × 20″
Crown	15″ × 20″
Demy	17 1/2″ × 22 1/2″
Double crown	20″ × 30″
Double demy	22 1/2″ × 35″
Double elephant	27″ × 40″
Double globe	28″ × 38″
Double imperial	30″ × 44″
Double foolscap ('foolscap' is sometimes shortened to ''cap' or 'cap')	17″ × 27″
Double large post	21″ × 33″
Double medium	23″ × 36″
Double post	19 1/4″ × 31 1/2″
Double pott	15″ × 25″
Double royal	25″ × 40″
Elephant	23″ × 28″
Foolscap ('foolscap' is sometimes shortened to ''cap' or 'cap')	13 1/2″ × 17″
Imperial	22″ × 30″
Large post	16 1/2″ × 21″
Medium	18″ × 23″
Music demy	14 3/8″ × 20 3/4″
Post	15 1/2″ × 19 1/4″
Pott	12 1/2″ × 15″
Quad crown	30″ × 40″
Quad demy	35″ × 45″
Quad foolscap ('foolscap' is sometimes shortened to ''cap' or 'cap')	27″ × 34″
Quad globe	38″ × 56″
Quad pott	25″ × 30″
Quad royal	40″ × 50″
Royal	20″ × 25″
Super royal	20 1/2″ × 27 1/2″
Wrapping paper
Bag cap	19 1/2″ × 24″
Casing	36″ × 46″
Double bag cap	24″ × 39″
Double crown	20″ × 30″
Double elephant	31″ × 46″
Double imperial	29″ × 45″
Double small cap	25″ × 34″
Double small hand	20″ × 29″
Elephant	24″ × 32″
Haven cap (sometimes called 'havon cap')	21″ × 26″
Imperial	22 1/2″ × 29″
Kent cap	18″ × 21″
Lumber hand	17 1/2″ × 22 1/2″
Quad small hand	30″ × 40″
Small cap	17″ × 25″
Small hand	15″ × 20″

Boards, mill boards, and cards are also referred to by names only.

Standardised British board sizes adopted by British Standards Institute specification number 730 of 1937
Imperial	22 1/2″ × 30″
Index	25 1/2″ × 30 1/2″
Large imperial	22 1/2″ × 32″
Postal	22 1/2″ × 28 1/2″
Royal	20″ × 25″

Standardised British board sizes adopted by the UK paper industry in 1925
Imperial	22″ × 30″
Index	25 1/2″ × 30 1/2″
Large imperial	22″ × 32″
Postal	22 1/2″ × 28 1/2″
Royal	20″ × 25″
Before the 1925 standardisation, the standard size for all types of board was royal (20″ × 25″).

Standard British mill‑board sizes
Crown	16 1/4″ × 20″
Extra royal	21 1/2″ × 28 1/2″
Foolscap	14 1/2″ × 18 1/2″
Half imperial	16 1/2″ × 23 1/2″
Large (also called 'medium')	19″ × 24″
Large half royal	14″ × 21″
Large middle demy (also called 'large demy')	18 1/2″ × 23 3/4″
Large whole royal	20 3/4″ × 26 3/4″
Middle demy (also called 'small demy')	18 1/2″ × 22 1/2″
Pott	14 1/4″ × 17 1/4″
Short	17″ × 21″
Small half imperial	15″ × 22 1/4″
Small half royal	13″ × 20 1/4″
Small whole royal	19 1/2″ × 25 1/2″
Whole imperial	22 1/2″ × 32″

Standardised British card sizes adopted by the UK paper industry in 1925
Cabinet	4 1/4″ × 6 1/2″
Carte‑de‑viste	2 1/2″ × 4 1/8″
Court	3 1/2″ × 4 1/2″
Double large	4 1/2″ × 6″
Double small	3 5/8″ × 4 3/4″
Extra thirds	1 3/4″ × 3″
Large	3″ × 4 1/2″
Postcard	3 1/2″ × 5 1/2″
Quad small	4 3/4″ × 7 1/4″
Quad large	6″ × 9″
Small	2 3/8″ × 3 5/8″
Thirds	1 1/2″ × 3″

Standard British card sizes before the 1925 standardisation
Cabinet	4 1/4″ × 6 1/2″
Carte‑de‑viste	2 1/2″ × 4 1/8″
Correspondence and square postcard	3 1/2″ × 4 1/2″
Double large	4 1/2″ × 6″
Double small	3 5/8″ × 4 3/4″
Extra third	1 3/4″ × 3″
Half large	2 1/4″ × 3″
Half small	1 13/16″ × 2 3/8″
Intimation	3 5/8″ × 6″
Large	3″ × 4 1/2″
Large court octavo	4″ × 4 7/8″
Postcard	3 1/2″ × 5 1/2″
Quad small	4 3/4″ × 7 1/4″
Quad large	6″ × 9″
Reduced small	2 1/8″ × 3 1/2″
Small	2 3/8″ × 3 5/8″
Third large	1 1/2″ × 3″
Town	2″ × 3″

The usual British imperial sizes of straw boards are 22″‑by‑32″ and 25″‑by‑30″.

== Traditional French paper sizes ==
Before the adoption of the ISO standard system in 1967, France had its own paper size system. Raisin format is still in use today for artistic paper. All are standardized by the AFNOR. Their names come from the watermarks that the papers were branded with when they were handcrafted, which is still the case for certain art papers. They also generally exist in double versions where the smallest measure is multiplied by two, or in quadruple versions where both measures have been doubled.

AFNOR paper sizes
Name	Format (cm × cm)	Use
Cloche	30 × 40	
Pot, écolier	31 × 40	
Tellière	34 × 44	Old French administration
Couronne écriture	36 × 46	
Couronne édition	37 × 47	
Roberto	39 × 50	anatomic drawing
Écu	40 × 52	
Coquille	44 × 56	
Carré	45 × 56	
Cavalier	46 × 62	
Demi-raisin	32,5 × 50	drawing
Raisin	50 × 65	drawing
Double raisin	65 × 100	
Jésus	56 × 76	Atlas des sentiers et chemins vicinaux
Soleil	60 × 80	
Colombier affiche	60 × 80	
Colombier commercial	63 × 90	
Petit Aigle	70 × 94	
Grand Aigle	75 × 105	Plans cadastraux primitifs (Napoleonic land registry)
Grand Aigle	75 × 106	Plans cadastraux primitifs (Napoleonic land registry)
Grand Aigle	75 × 110	Plans cadastraux primitifs (Napoleonic land registry)
Grand Monde	90 × 126	
Univers	100 × 130	

== Business card sizes ==
Common business card sizes
Origin	mm × mm	inch × inch	AR
A8	74 × 52	2 15/16 × 2 1/16	√2
B8	88 × 62	3 4/9 × 2 4/9	√2
Western Europe	85 × 55	3 1/3 × 2 1/6	17∶11
International	86 × 54	3 3/8 × 2 1/8	27∶17
North America	89 × 51	3 1/2 × 2	7∶4
Eastern Europe, Asia, Africa, South America	90 × 50	3 9/16 × 2	9∶5
East Asia	90 × 54	3 9/16 × 2 1/8	5∶3
Scandinavia, Southeast Asia, Oceania	90 × 55	3 9/16 × 2 1/6	18∶11
Japan	91 × 55	3 7/12 × 2 1/6	1.65̅4̅

The international business card has the size of the smallest rectangle containing a credit card rounded to full millimetres, but in Western Europe, it is rounded to half centimetres (rounded up in Northern Europe), in Eastern Europe to full centimetres, in North America to half inches. However, credit card size, as defined in ISO/IEC 7810, also specifies rounded corners and thickness.

== Newspaper sizes ==
Comparison of some newspaper sizes with metric paper sizes. Approximate nominal dimensions are in millimetres.

Newspapers have a separate set of sizes.

- Compact: AR 1.54
- Berliner: aspect ratio is 1.5
- Rhenish: AR 1.4–1.5
- Tabloid 1.34
- Broadsheet: aspect ratio 1.25, height 22.5 inches (57 cm)

In a recent trend, many newspapers have been undergoing what is known as "web cut down", in which the publication is redesigned to print using a narrower (and less expensive) roll of paper. In extreme examples, some broadsheet papers are nearly as narrow as traditional tabloids.

== See also ==
- Book size – Form a book is produced into
- Continuous stationery – Paper designed for use with dot-matrix and line printers
- Hole punch – Office tool for making uniform holes in paper
- Margin – White space that surrounds the content of a page
- Paper density – Paper product's mass per unit volume
- PC LOAD LETTER – Printer error message
- Photo print sizes – Photography paper sheet dimensions
- Tiled printing – Multiple pages used to print a large image
- Toilet paper § Sheet size
- Units of paper quantity – Various measures of paper quantity

Canadian custom paper size standards
Number	Title	Original CAN2 release	CAN/CGSB replacement	Withdrawal
9.60	Paper Sizes for Correspondence	1976-04	1994-07	2012-04
9.61	Paper Sizes for Printing	1976-04	1994-07	2012-04
9.62	Paper Sizes for Single Part Continuous Business Forms	1981-12	1994-07	2012-04
9.64	Drawing Sheet Sizes	1979-04	1994-07	2012-04
200.2	Common Image Area for Paper Sizes P4 and A4	1979-04		2012-03
