= Octavo =

Technical term describing the format of a book

Octavo metrics compared to the folio and quarto

Octavo, a Latin word meaning "in eighth" or "for the eighth time", (abbreviated 8vo, 8º, or In-8) is a technical term describing the format of a book, which refers to the size of leaves produced from folding a full sheet of paper on which multiple pages of text were printed to form the individual sections (or gatherings) of a book. An octavo is a book or pamphlet made up of one or more full sheets (e.g. of A2 paper) on which 16 pages of text were printed, which were then folded three times to produce eight leaves. Each leaf of an octavo book thus represents one eighth the size of the original sheet. Other common book formats are folios and quartos. Octavo is also used as a general description of the size of books that are about 8 to 10 inches (200 to 250 millimetres) tall (almost A4 paper size), and as such does not necessarily indicate the actual printing format of the books, which may even be unknown as is the case for many modern books. These terms are discussed in greater detail in book sizes.

== Format ==
An octavo is a book or pamphlet made up of one or more full sheets of paper on which 16 pages of text were printed, which were then folded three times to produce eight leaves. Each leaf of an octavo book thus represents one eighth the size of the original sheet.

There are many variations in how octavos were produced. For example, bibliographers call a book printed as an octavo (eight leaves per full sheet), but bound in gatherings of 4 leaves each, an "octavo in 4s."

The actual size of an octavo book depends on the size of the full sheet of paper on which it was printed. The size of such sheets varied in different localities and times. A sixteenth-century octavo printed in France or Italy is about the size of a modern cheap paperback, whereas an eighteenth-century octavo printed in England is larger, about the size of a modern hardcover novel.

The Gutenberg Bible was printed as a folio in about 1455, in which four pages of text were printed on each sheet of paper, which were then folded once. Several such folded conjugate pairs of leaves were inserted inside another to produce the sections or gatherings, which were then sewn together to form the final book.

=== History ===
The oldest surviving octavo book apparently is the so-called "Turkish calendar" for 1455, presumably printed in late 1454, about the same time as the Gutenberg Bible. Numerous other octavos survive beginning from about 1461. The British Library Incunabula Short Title Catalogue currently lists about 28,100 different editions of surviving books, pamphlets and broadsides (some fragmentary only) printed before 1501, of which about 2,850 are octavos, representing 10 percent of all works in the catalogue.

Johann Froben was the first in 1491 to print Bible in octavo and with illustration; his edition became known as "Poor man's Bible" due to its affordability. Beginning in 1501, Aldus Manutius of Venice began to print classical works in small octavo format which were easily portable. These editions contained only the text of the works, without the commentary and notes, and became very popular with educated readers. As a result, Aldus became closely associated with the octavo format.

== Size ==
Beginning in the mid-nineteenth century, technology permitted the manufacture of large sheets or rolls of paper on which books were printed, many text pages at a time. As a result, it may be impossible to determine the actual format (i.e., the number of leaves formed from each sheet fed into a press). The term "octavo" as applied to such books may refer simply to the size of the book. The use of the term "octavo" as applied to such books refers to books which are generally between 8 and 10 inches (200 and 250 mm) tall, the most common size for modern hardbound books. More specific sizes are denoted by reference to certain paper sizes as follows:

- Foolscap octavo, 6 3/4 in × 4 1/4 in (170 mm × 110 mm)
- Crown octavo 7 1/2 in × 5 in (190 mm × 130 mm)
- Demy octavo, 8 3/4 in × 5 5/8 in (220 mm × 140 mm)
- Globe octavo, ? × ?
- Royal octavo, 10 in × 6 1/4 in (250 mm × 160 mm)

== See also ==
- Book size
- Bookbinding
- Folio
- Paper size
- Quarto
- Units of paper quantity
