= Photo print sizes =

Photography paper sheet dimensions

Standard photographic print sizes are used in photographic printing. Cut sheets of paper meant for printing photographs are commonly sold in these sizes.

Many nominal and effective sizes are specified in international standard ISO 1008 using millimeters only, although most are clearly derived from integer-inch lengths. They are highlighted in the table below.

== United States ==
In the US, size names are often denoted with a code of the format nR, where the number n represents the length of the shorter edge in inches. In the normal series, the long edge is the length of the short edge plus 2 inches (10 in or less) or 3 inches (11 in and above). The alternative Super series, denoted SnR, nR Plus or nR+, has an aspect ratio of 3∶2 (or as close as possible) and thus provides a better fit for standard 135 film (35 mm) at sizes of 8 inches or above. 5R is twice the size of a 2R print, 6R twice the size of a 4R print and S8R twice the size of 6R. 4D/6D is a newer size for most consumer level digital cameras and Micro 4/3 cameras American S8R or Japanese 6PW at 203 mm × 305 mm is the closest 3∶2 approximation to A4 at 210 mm × 297 mm (√2∶1).

The sizes with 7 × 9 1/2, 12 × 16 (4∶3) and 9 1/2 × 12 inches (5∶4) are used for black-and-white paper.

== Japan ==
In Japan, the same print sizes (and several additional ones) are known by different designations. The Japanese L is equivalent to 3R, while 2L—twice the size—matches 5R. KG represents the size of a traditional 4 × 6 in (4R) Japanese postcard (hagaki).

The nP or cut (切り, kiri) series are defined in reference to a full page size (全紙, zenshi) of 457 × 560 mm, with smaller numbers (fewer cuts) indicating larger sizes. A W suffix indicates sizes with an extended long edge, similar to the American S prefix. Japanese Chou sizes are for envelopes and Hagaki for postcards. They do not match exactly the related sizes from ISO 216, like A6 for international standard postcards.

== Overview ==
Unlike ISO 216 paper sizes, the aspect ratios of photographic prints vary, so exact scaling of prints is not always possible. However, some logical correspondences are between the sizes, noted below when applicable.

Many of the standard sizes are the same as sheet film formats, and are appropriate for making contact sheets from these films.

Common photo print sizes and codes, approximate dimensions in parentheses
US	Japan	China	cm	Alias	in × in	mm × mm	min. Mpx	Aspect ratio	Standard
		1"	2.5 × 3.5		1 × 1.5	25.4 × 38.1			No
		Big 1"/Small 2"			1.29921 × 1.88976	33 × 48			No
		2" (for certificates)			1.37795 × 1.92913	35 × 49			No
		2"			1.37795 × 2.08661	35 × 53			No
				A9	(1.5 × 2)	37 × 52	0.27	7∶5 (√2)	ISO 216
				Wallet	2 × 3	(50.8 × 76.2)	0.54	3∶2	No
				A8	(2 × 3)	52 × 74	0.54	7∶5 (√2)	ISO 216
2R				Wallet (old)	2 1/2 × 3 1/2	(63.5 × 88.9)	1.78	7∶5	No
				A7	(3 × 4)	74 × 105	1.08	7∶5 (√2)	ISO 216
	DSC				(3 1/4 × 4 2/3)	83 × 119	1.38	3∶2 (Note: Aspect ratio is approximate to the nearest ratio involving small numbers.) (1.43)	No
	DSC				(3 1/2 × 4 2/3)	89 × 119	1.48	4∶3 (1.34)	No
3R	L	5"	9 × 13	Enprint	3 1/2 × 5	89 × 127	1.58	10∶7 (1.43)	ISO 1008
	PC		10 × 15	Hagaki	(3.9 × 5.8)	100 × 148	1.94	3∶2 (1.48)	No
	PC		10 × 15	A6	(4.1 × 5.8)	105 × 148	2.17	7∶5 (√2)	ISO 216
4R	KG	6"	10 × 15		4 × 6	102 × 152	2.16	3∶2	No
					4 × 4	102 × 102	1.45	1∶1	No
					4 1/2 × 6	114 × 152	2.43	4∶3	US?
					5 × 5	127 × 127	2.26	1∶1	No
5R	2L	7"	13 × 18		5 × 7	127 × 178	3.15	7∶5 (√2)	ISO 1008
			15 × 20	Ofuku Hagaki	(5.8 × 7.9)	148 × 200	4.12	4∶3 (1.35)	No
			15 × 20	A5	(5.8 × 8.3)	148 × 210	4.34	7∶5 (√2)	ISO 216
6R	8P	8"	15 × 20		6 × 8	152 × 203	4.32	4∶3	US?
			18 × 24		7 × 9 1/2	178 × 240	6.00	4∶3 (1.36)	ISO 1008
8R	6P		20 × 25		8 × 10	203 × 254	7.20	5∶4	ISO 1008
				Letter	8 1/2 × 11	215.9 × 279.4	8.42	13∶10 (1.29)	ISO 1008
8R+, S8R	6PW	Small 12"	20 × 30		8 × 12	203 × 305	8.64	3∶2	US?
			20 × 30	A4	(8 1/4 × 11 2/3)	210 × 297	8.70	7∶5 (√2)	ISO 1008
			24 × 30		9 1/2 × 12	240 × 305	10.3	5∶4 (1.26)	ISO 1008
10R	4P	12"			10 × 12	254 × 305	10.8	6∶5	ISO 1008
	4PW				10 × 14 1/2	254 × 368	13.0	3∶2 (1.45)	No
10R+, S10R					10 × 15	254 × 381	13.5	3∶2	US?
11R			28 × 36		11 × 14	279 × 356	14.7	5∶4 (1.27)	ISO 1008
				A3	(11 2/3 × 16 1/2)	297 × 420	17.4	7∶5 (√2)	ISO 216
12R					12 × 15	305 × 381	16.2	5∶4	No
11R+, S11R				Tabloid, Ledger	11 × 17	279 × 432	16.8	3∶2 (1.55)	US?
			30 × 40		12 × 16	305 × 406	17.3	4∶3	ISO 1008
12R+, S12R					12 × 18	305 × 457	19.4	3∶2	US?
14R					14 × 17	355 × 431		17∶14	No
16R			40 × 50		16 × 20	406 × 508	28.8	5∶4	ISO 1008
16R+, S16R					16 × 24	406 × 609		3∶2	No
				A2	(16 1/2 × 23 1/3)	420 × 594	34.8	7∶5 (√2)	ISO 216
20R			50 × 60		20 × 24	508 × 610	43.2	6∶5	ISO 1008
20R+, S20R					20 × 28	508 × 711		7∶5	No
22R					20 × 29.5	508 × 749		59∶40	No
24R					24 × 31.5	609 × 800		21∶16	No
				A1	(23 1/3 × 33 1/10)	594 × 841	69.7	7∶5 (√2)	ISO 216
24R+, S24R					24 × 35.5	609 × 901		3∶2	No
30R					30 × 40	762 × 1,016		4∶3	No

== See also ==
- Film format § Still photography film formats
- International standard paper sizes
- Paper size § Photography sizes
- Standard ad size
