= 4x6 =

4x6 (four-by-six) may refer as:

- A common photo print size
- A common term for vehicles with "4 wheel drive", but have 6 wheels total, like for instance the semi tractors used to tow their trailers.
