= RA3 =

RA3 may refer to:

- Command & Conquer: Red Alert 3, a real-time strategy video game
- Raccordo autostradale RA3
- Rocket Arena 3, an unofficial game modification for first-person shooter Quake III: Arena
- RA3, an ISO 217 standard paper size
- RA3, a file extension for RA3DIO Terrain Information software
- RA3, a Russian diesel multiple unit manufactured by Metrovagonmash
