= Letter (paper size) =

Paper size of 8.5 by 11 inches

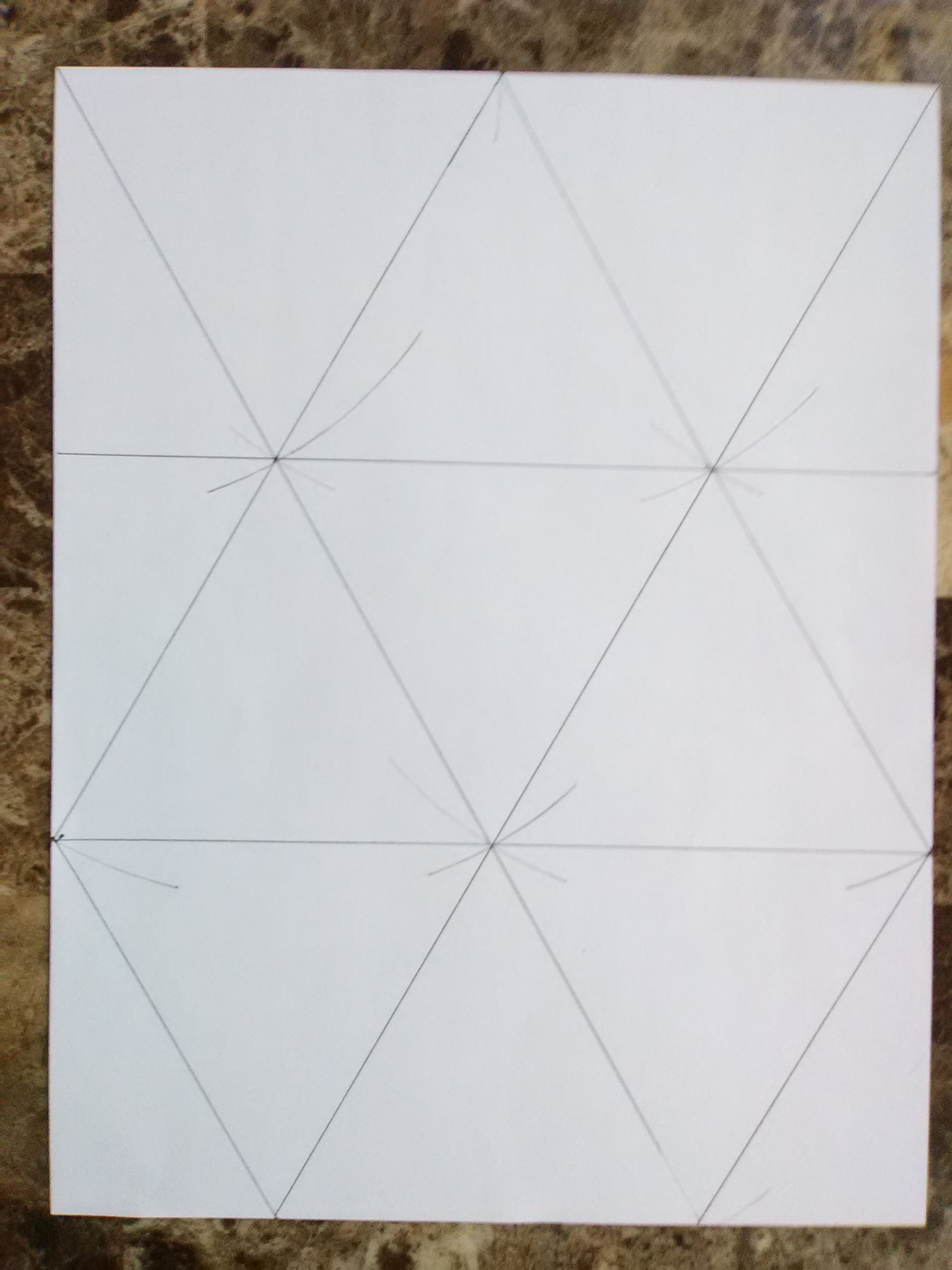
Letter paper tiled with almost equilateral triangles. (Perfectly equilateral triangles require the aspect ratio to be 3/4√3 ≈ 1.299.)

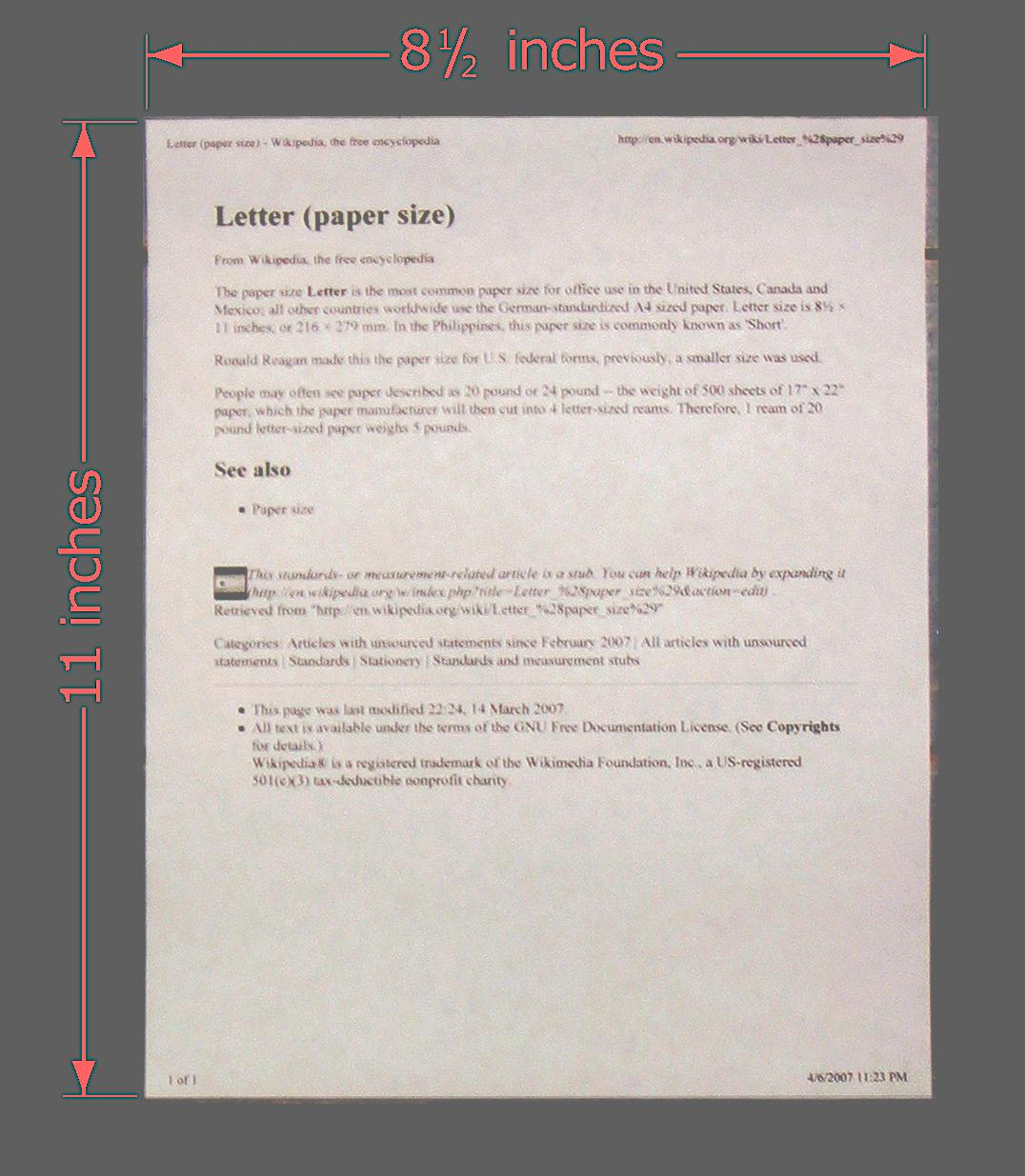
A Letter-size page

Comparison of Letter (shaded light blue) and Government letter sizes with some similar paper and photographic paper sizes

Letter (officially ANSI A) is a paper size standard defined in ANSI/ASME Y14.1 by the American National Standards Institute, commonly used as home or office stationery primarily in the United States, Canada, and the Philippines, and variably across Latin America. It measures 8.5 by 11 inches (215.9 by 279.4 mm) and is similar in use to the A4 paper standard at 210 mm × 297 mm (8.27 in × 11.7 in) used by most other countries, defined in ISO 216 by the International Organization for Standardization.

== Details ==
The Reagan administration made Letter-size paper the norm for US federal forms in the early 1980s; previously, the smaller "official" Government Letter size, 8 by 10.5 inches (203.2 by 266.7 mm) (aspect ratio: 1.3125), was used in government, while 8.5-by-11-inch (215.9 by 279.4 mm) paper was standard in most other offices. The aspect ratio is 22/17 ≈ 1.294 and the diagonal is √8.5^{2} + 11^{2} ≈ 13.901 inches (353.1 mm) in length.

In the US, paper density is usually measured in "pounds per ream" (of 500 sheets). Typical Letter paper has a basis weight of paper of 20 or 24 pounds (9.1 or 10.9 kg) – the weight of 500 sheets (a ream) of 17-by-22-inch (431.8 by 558.8 mm) paper at 70 °F (21 °C) and at 50% humidity. One ream of 20-pound Letter-sized paper weighs 5 pounds (2.3 kg), and a single Letter-sized sheet of 20-pound paper weighs 0.16 ounces (4.536 g), which is equivalent to 75.19 g/m^{2}. Some metric information is typically included on American ream packaging. For example, 20-pound paper is also labeled as 75 g/m^{2}. The most common density of A4 paper is 80 g/m^{2}.

The related paper size known as Invoice (colloquially Half Letter) is exactly one half of the US Letter size: 8.5 by 5.5 inches (215.9 by 139.7 mm).

== History ==
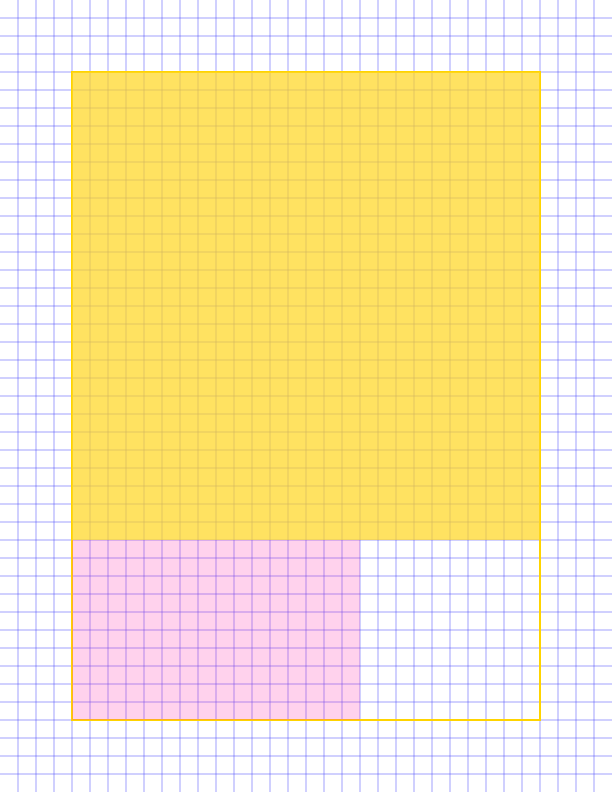

The precise origins of the dimensions of US letter-size paper (8.5 × 11 in) are unknown. The American Forest & Paper Association says that the standard US dimensions have their origin in the days of manual papermaking, with the 11-inch length of the standard paper being about a quarter of "the average maximum stretch of an experienced vatman's arms". The letter size falls within the range of the historical quarto size, which since pre-modern times refers to page sizes of 8 to 9 inches (200 to 230 mm) wide and 10 to 11 inches (250 to 280 mm) high, and it is indeed almost exactly one quarter of the old Imperial (British) paper size known as demy quarto – 17 1/2 by 22 1/2 inches (444.5 by 571.5 mm) – allowing one-half inch (12.7 mm) for trimming.

== See also ==
- ANSI/ASME Y14.1
- ISO 216
- Loose paper sizes
- PC LOAD LETTER
