= Foolscap folio =

Paper size historically common in some parts of Europe, and former British territories

A comparison of the A4 and Foolscap folio papersize

Foolscap folio, commonly contracted to foolscap or cap or folio and in short FC, is paper made in or cut to the size of 8.5 × 13.5 in (216 × 343 mm) for printing or to 8 × 13 in (203 × 330 mm) for "normal" writing paper (foolscap). This was a traditional paper size used in some parts of Europe, and the British Commonwealth, before the adoption of the international standard A4 paper.

== Size ==
A full (plano) foolscap paper sheet is actually 13 1/2 × 17 in (343 × 432 mm) in size, and a folio sheet of any type is half the base sheet size.

Foolscap folio
Name	inch × inch	mm × mm	AR	Characteristic
Foolscap folio	8½ × 13½	216 × 343 ª	1:1.5879	Imperial (half foolscap), printing
Foolscap folio	8 × 13	203 × 330	1:1.6256	Traditional British, writing

ª Approximate measure in current use in Latin America: 216 x 341 mm.

Ring binders or lever arch files designed to hold foolscap folios are often used to hold A4 paper (210 × 297 mm, 8 1/4 × 11 3/4 in). The slightly larger size of such a binder offers greater protection to the edges of the pages it contains.

== History ==
Historically, there were two prevalent foolscap folio paper sizes: British foolscap and imperial foolscap. The British foolscap measured approximately 8.0 by 13.0 inches (203 mm by 330 mm) and was widely used in the United Kingdom for official documents and administrative records. On the other hand, the imperial foolscap was slightly larger, measuring around 8.5 by 13.5 inches (216 mm by 343 mm). This larger format was preferred in some regions of the British Empire for similar purposes. Both paper sizes represented an era when handwritten records and official documentation were prevalent, but they have since faded into history, replaced by contemporary paper standards.

=== Europe ===
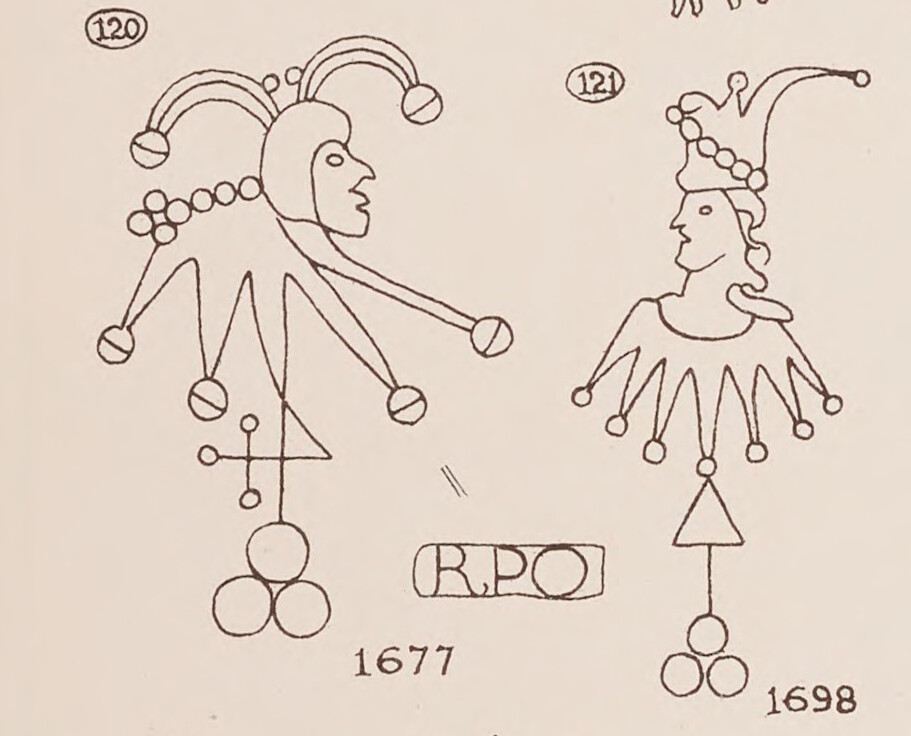
Two versions of the Fool's Cap watermark from 17th-century England

Foolscap was named after the fool's cap and bells watermark commonly used from the 15th century onwards on paper of these dimensions. The earliest example of such paper was made in Germany in 1479. Unsubstantiated anecdotes suggest that this watermark was introduced to England in 1580 by John Spilman, a German who established a papermill at Dartford, Kent.

The general pattern of the mark was used by Dutch and English papermakers in the late 17th and 18th centuries, and as early as 1674 the term "foolscap" was being used to designate a specific size of paper regardless of its watermark.

Apocryphally, the Rump Parliament of 1648–1653 substituted a fool's cap for the royal arms as a watermark on the paper used for the journals of Parliament. According to the Oxford Dictionary of Word Origins, there is no basis in fact for this statement. (Note: Charles I was executed on 30 January 1649, which would have been the cause of this supposed change. There were only around 40 mills making hand-made paper in England between 1601 and 1650, with 23 of them within 30 miles of London. It appears that the manufacture of white paper in England had come to a halt in around 1641, perhaps because of the lack of a linen industry for raw materials, and more likely because of the impact of the troubled times leading to the Civil War. The French had become the most prominent supplier of white paper from around 1600 to 1675, when the Dutch took over. If there is any truth in the matter, it is possible that imported paper bearing such a mark might be the cause.)

=== Mexico ===
In Mexico, the foolscap folio paper size is 8 1/2 by 13 1/2 inches (216 mm × 343 mm) and is named (locally) oficio ('official').

=== United States ===
Today in the United States, a half-foolscap sized paper for printing is standardized to 8 1/2 by 14 inches (216 mm × 356 mm), widely available and sold as "legal sized paper" for printing, writing, note-taking etc. A full foolscap size paper of 14 by 17 inches (356 mm × 432 mm) is also widely available for arts and crafts etc. alongside the 11 by 17 inches (279 mm × 432 mm) tabloid size.

In the United States in the 19th century, paper was sold either flat or folded in half. Folded foolscap was often 12 1/2 by 16 inches (317 mm × 406 mm), but smaller and larger sizes were also found. Legal foolscap of 8 by 24 inches (203 mm × 610 mm) was always sold ruled and folded in half at the printers by a folding machine, resulting in a leaflet 8 by 12 inches (203 mm × 305 mm), almost the same as modern A4 paper, which is 8.27 by 11.69 inches (210 mm × 297 mm)

There were numerous other sizes with variations on the "cap" name:

- Flat cap (i.e. unfolded). 14 by 17 inches (356 mm × 432 mm)
- Small Flat cap (or law blank cap, corporation cap or legal cap). 13 by 16 inches (330 mm × 406 mm)
- Exchange cap – thin, highly calendered, hard and strong paper used for bills of exchange, certificates and other blanks where light weight and ability to receive hard usages was required.
- Drawing cap – cold-pressed, for making drawing books and printing imitation antique work.
- Double cap writing – for both writing and ledger papers. 17 by 28 inches (432 mm × 711 mm)
- Double foolscap. 26 1/2 by 16 3/4 inches (673 mm × 425 mm)

== F4 ==
F4 is a paper size 210 mm × 330 mm (8.27 in × 13.0 in). Although metric, based on the A4 paper size (210 mm × 297 mm), and named to suggest that it is part of the official ISO 216 paper sizes, it is only a de facto standard.

It is often referred to as (metric) "foolscap" or "folio" because of its similarity to the traditional foolscap folio size of 8 1/2 in × 13 1/2 in (216 mm × 343 mm).
