= Atlas des chemins vicinaux =

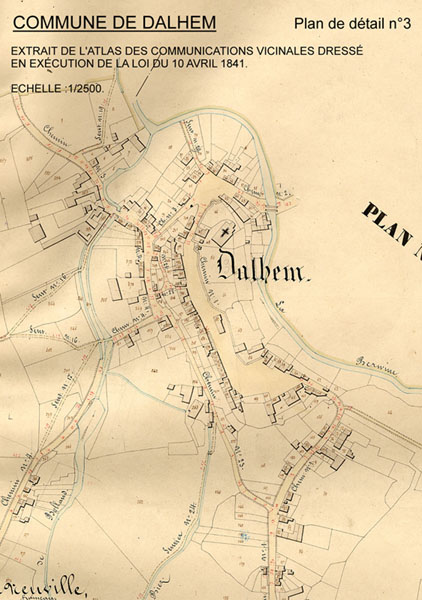
Extract of the Atlas

The Atlas des chemins vicinaux (French) or Atlas der Buurtwegen (Dutch) was produced in order to preserve the Belgian street network from possible usurpations. A law passed on 10 April 1841 led to the creation of an atlas of streets, roads and paths in each town, to specify officially the Belgium public roads network.

This atlas is still the only document which defines the public domain in Belgium.
