= ISO 217 =

International standard for sizes of raw, untrimmed paper

The ISO 217:2013 standard defines the RA and SRA paper formats.

== Overview ==
These paper series are untrimmed raw paper. RA stands for "raw format A" and SRA stands for "supplementary raw format A". The RA and SRA formats are slightly larger than the corresponding A series formats. This allows bleed (ink to the edge) on printed material that will be later cut down to size. These paper sheets will after printing and binding be cut to match the A format.

- The ISO A0 format has an area of 1.00 m^{2}
- The ISO RA0 format has an area of 1.05 m^{2}
- The ISO SRA0 format has an area of 1.15 m^{2}

RA	Series formats	SRA	Series formats
RA0	860 × 1220	SRA0	900 × 1280
RA1	610 × 860	SRA1	640 × 900
RA2	430 × 610	SRA2	450 × 640
RA3	305 × 430	SRA3	320 × 450
RA4	215 × 305	SRA4	225 × 320

== Tolerances ==
Paper in the RA and SRA series format is intended to have a $1:\sqrt{2}$ aspect ratio but the dimensions of the start format have been rounded to whole centimetres.

For example, the RA0 format has been rounded to 860 mm × 1220 mm from the theoretical dimensions $\sqrt{1.05}\cdot2^{-\frac14} \mathrm{m} \times \sqrt{1.05}\cdot2^{\frac14} \mathrm{m} \approx 861.7 \mathrm{mm} \times 1218.6 \mathrm{mm}$.

The resulting real ratios are:

- $43:61 \approx 1:1.4186$ for RA0, RA2, RA4;
- $61:86 \approx 1:1.4098$ for RA1, RA3;
- $45:64 \approx 1:1.4222$ for SRA0, SRA2, SRA4;
- $32:45 = 1:1.40625$ for SRA1, SRA3.

The sizes of the RA series are also slightly larger than corresponding inch-based US sizes specified in ANSI/ASME Y14.1, e.g. RA4 is roughly equivalent to 8 1/2 in × 12 in (220 mm × 300 mm) and ANSI A (alias US Letter) is defined as 8 1/2 in × 11 in (220 mm × 280 mm).

== Other ISO paper standards ==
- ISO 216:1975, defines two series of paper sizes: A and B
- ISO 269:1985, defines a C series for envelopes
