= International standard paper sizes =

International standard for paper sizes, including A4

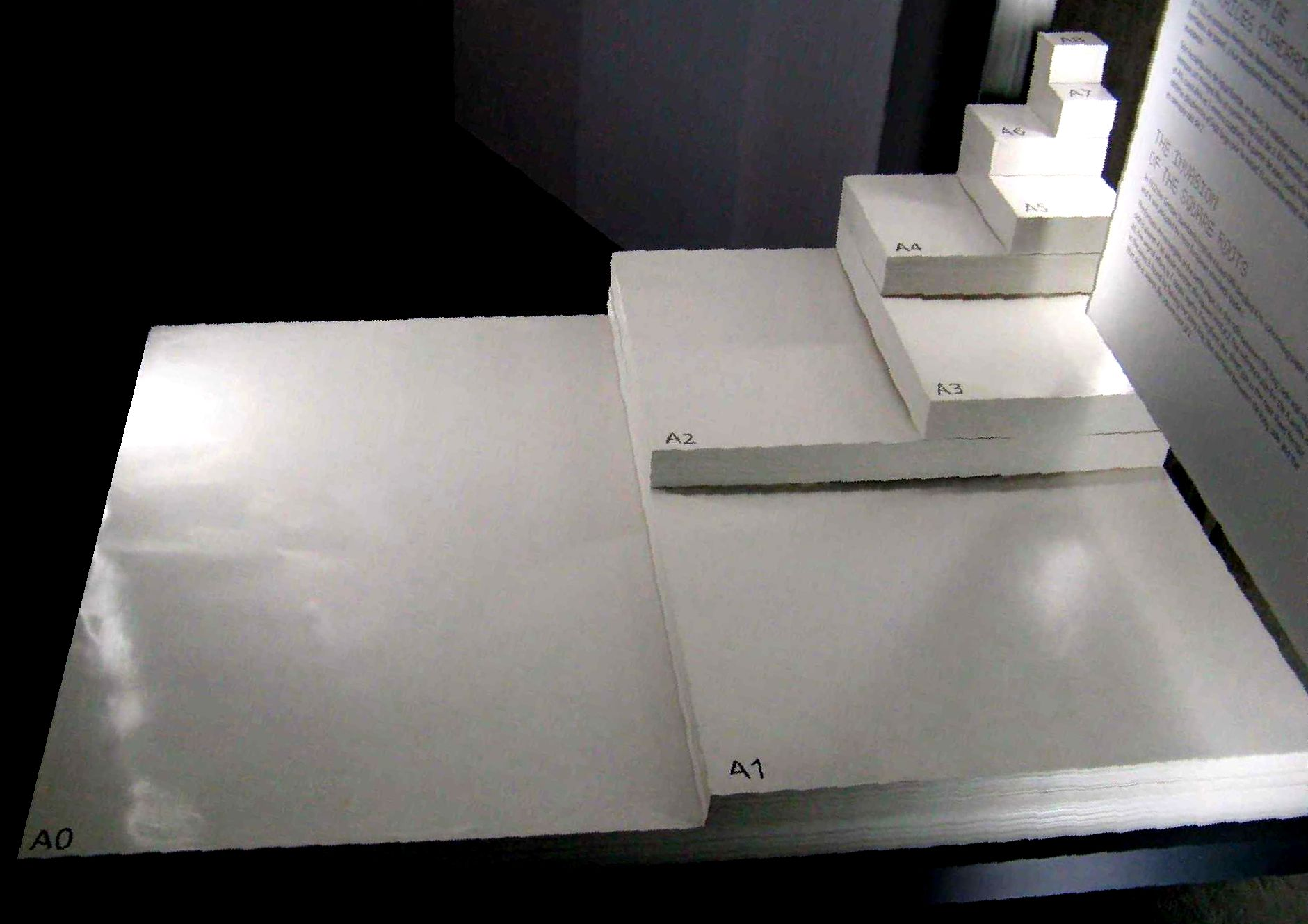
Visualization with paper sizes in formats A0 to A8, exhibited at the science museum CosmoCaixa Barcelona

ISO 216 is an international standard for paper sizes, used around the world except in North America, the Philippines and parts of Latin America. The standard defines the "A", "B" and "C" series of paper sizes, which includes A4, the most commonly available paper size worldwide. Two supplementary standards, ISO 217 and ISO 269, define related paper sizes.

All ISO 216, ISO 217 and ISO 269 paper sizes (except some envelopes) have the same aspect ratio, √2:1, within rounding error. This ratio has the unique property that when cut or folded in half widthways, the halves also have the same aspect ratio. Each ISO paper size is one half of the area of the next larger size in the same series.

== Dimensions of A, B and C series ==
ISO paper sizes in millimetres and in inches
Size	A series formats			B series formats			C series formats		
Size	name	mm	inches	name	mm	inches	name	mm	inches
−2	4A0	1682 × 2378	66.2 × 93.6						
−1	2A0	1189 × 1682	46.8 × 66.2	2B0	1414 × 2000	55.7 × 78.7	2C0	1297 × 1834	51.1 × 72.2
0	A0	841 × 1189	33.1 × 46.8	B0	1000 × 1414	39.4 × 55.7	C0	917 × 1297	36.1 × 51.1
1	A1	594 × 841	23.4 × 33.1	B1	707 × 1000	27.8 × 39.4	C1	648 × 917	25.5 × 36.1
2	A2	420 × 594	16.5 × 23.4	B2	500 × 707	19.7 × 27.8	C2	458 × 648	18.0 × 25.5
3	A3	297 × 420	11.7 × 16.5	B3	353 × 500	13.9 × 19.7	C3	324 × 458	12.8 × 18.0
4	A4	210 × 297	8.3 × 11.7	B4	250 × 353	9.8 × 13.9	C4	229 × 324	9.0 × 12.8
5	A5	148 × 210	5.8 × 8.3	B5	176 × 250	6.9 × 9.8	C5	162 × 229	6.4 × 9.0
6	A6	105 × 148	4.1 × 5.8	B6	125 × 176	4.9 × 6.9	C6	114 × 162	4.5 × 6.4
7	A7	74 × 105	2.9 × 4.1	B7	88 × 125	3.5 × 4.9	C7	81 × 114	3.2 × 4.5
8	A8	52 × 74	2.0 × 2.9	B8	62 × 88	2.4 × 3.5	C8	57 × 81	2.2 × 3.2
9	A9	37 × 52	1.5 × 2.0	B9	44 × 62	1.7 × 2.4	C9	40 × 57	1.6 × 2.2
10	A10	26 × 37	1.0 × 1.5	B10	31 × 44	1.2 × 1.7	C10	28 × 40	1.1 × 1.6

Comparison of ISO 216 paper sizes between A4 and A3 and Swedish extension SIS 014711 sizes

== History ==
The oldest known mention of the advantages of basing a paper size on an aspect ratio of $\sqrt{2}$ is found in a letter written on 25 October 1786 by the German scientist Georg Christoph Lichtenberg to Johann Beckmann, both at the University of Göttingen. Early variants of the formats that would become ISO paper sizes A2, A3, B3, B4, and B5 then evolved in France, where they were listed in a 1798 French law on taxation of publications (French: Loi sur le timbre (Nº 2136)) that was based in part on page sizes.

Comparison of A4 (shaded grey) and C4 sizes with some similar paper and photographic paper sizes

Searching for a standard system of paper formats on a scientific basis at the Bridge association (German: Die Brücke), as a replacement for the vast variety of other paper formats that had been used before, in order to make paper stocking and document reproduction cheaper and more efficient, in 1911 Wilhelm Ostwald proposed, over a hundred years after the 1798 French law, a global standard – a world format (Weltformat) – for paper sizes based on the ratio $\sqrt{2}$, referring to the argument advanced by Lichtenberg's 1786 letter, but linking this to the metric system using 1 cm as the width of the base format. Walter Porstmann argued in a long article published in 1918, that a firm basis for the system of paper formats, which deal with surfaces, ought not be the length but the area; that is, linking the system of paper formats to the metric system using the square metre rather than the centimetre, constrained by $\tfrac{L}{S}=\sqrt{2}$ and area $A = L \times S = 1$ square metre, where $L$ is the length of the longer side and $S$ is the length of the shorter side, for the second equation both in metres. Porstmann also argued that formats for containers of paper, such as envelopes, should be 10% larger than the paper format itself.

In 1921, after a long discussion and another intervention by Porstmann, the Standardisation Committee of German Industry (Normenausschuß der deutschen Industrie, or NADI in short), which is the German Institute for Standardisation (Deutsches Institut für Normung, or DIN in short) today, published German standard DI Norm 476 the specification of four series of paper formats with ratio $\sqrt{2}$, with series A as the always preferred formats and basis for the other series. All measures are in millimetres. The measurements of A0 are rounded to the nearest millimetre, and other sizes are derived by dividing or multiplying from A0 and then rounding to a whole number of millimetres. A4 is recommended as the standard paper size for business, administrative and government correspondence, and A6 for postcards. Series B is based on B0 with width of 1 m, C0 is 917 by 1,297 mm, and D0 771 by 1,090 mm. Series C is the basis for envelope formats.

The DIN paper-format concept was soon introduced as a national standard in many other countries, for example, Belgium (1924), Netherlands (1925), Norway (1926), Switzerland (1929), Sweden (1930), Soviet Union (1934), Hungary (1938), Italy (1939), Finland (1942), Uruguay (1942), Argentina (1943), Brazil (1943), Spain (1947), Austria (1948), Romania (1949), Japan (1951), Denmark (1953), Czechoslovakia (1953), Israel (1954), Portugal (1954), Yugoslavia (1956), India (1957), Poland (1957), United Kingdom (1959), Venezuela (1962), New Zealand (1963), Iceland (1964), Mexico (1965), South Africa (1966), France (1967), Peru (1967), Turkey (1967), Chile (1968), Greece (1970), Zimbabwe (1970), Singapore (1970), Bangladesh (1972), Thailand (1973), Barbados (1973), Australia (1974), Ecuador (1974), Colombia (1975) and Kuwait (1975).

It finally became both an international standard (ISO 216) as well as the official United Nations document format in 1975, and it is today used in almost all countries in the world, with the exception of several countries in the Americas.

In 1977, a large German car manufacturer performed a study of the paper formats found in their incoming mail and concluded that out of 148 examined countries, 88 already used the A series formats.

== Advantages ==
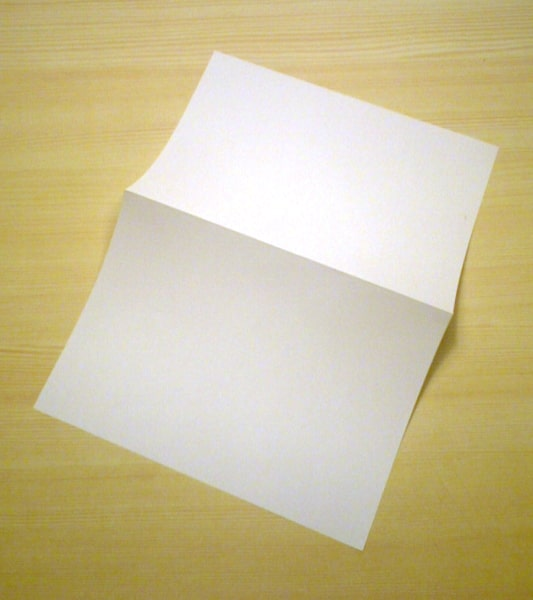
An A4 paper sheet folded into two A5 size pages

The main advantage of this system is its scaling. Rectangular paper with an aspect ratio of $\sqrt{2}$ has the unique property that, when cut in two across the midpoints of the longer sides, each half has the same $\sqrt{2}$ aspect ratio as the whole sheet before it was divided. Equivalently, if one lays two same-sized sheets of paper with an aspect ratio of $\sqrt{2}$ side by side along their longer side, they form a larger rectangle with the aspect ratio of $\sqrt{2}$ and double the area of each individual sheet.

The ISO system of paper sizes exploits these properties of the $\sqrt{2}$ aspect ratio. In each series of sizes (for example, series A), the largest size is numbered 0 (so in this case A0), and each successive size (A1, A2, etc.) has half the area of the preceding sheet and can be cut by halving the length of the preceding size sheet. The new measurement is rounded down to the nearest millimetre. A folded brochure can be made by using a sheet of the next larger size (for example, an A4 sheet is folded in half to make a brochure with size A5 pages). An office photocopier or printer can be designed to reduce a page from A4 to A5 or to enlarge a page from A4 to A3. Similarly, two sheets of A4 can be scaled down to fit one A3 sheet without excess empty paper.

This system also simplifies calculating the weight of paper. Under ISO 536, paper's grammage is defined as a sheet's mass in grams (g) per area in square metres (unit symbol g/m^{2}; the nonstandard abbreviation "gsm" is also used). One can derive the weight of other sizes by arithmetic division. A standard A4 sheet made from 80 g/m^{2} paper weighs 5 g, as it is 1/16 (four halvings, ignoring rounding) of an A0 page. Thus the weight, and the associated postage rate, can be approximated easily by counting the number of sheets used.

ISO 216 and its related standards were first published between 1975 and 1995:

- ISO 216:2007, defining the A and B series of paper sizes
- ISO 269:1985, defining the C series for envelopes
- ISO 217:2013, defining the RA and SRA series of raw ("untrimmed") paper sizes

== Properties ==
=== A series ===
Paper in the A series format has an aspect ratio of √2 (≈ 1.414, when rounded). A0 is defined so that it has an area of 1 square metre before rounding to the nearest 1 mm. Successive paper sizes in the series (A1, A2, A3, etc.) are defined by halving the area of the (unrounded) preceding paper size and rounding down, so that the long side of A(n + 1) is the same length as the short side of An. Hence, each next size is nearly exactly half the area of the prior size. So two A2 pages (in landscape orientation) fit together over an A1 page (in portrait orientation), an A3 page is half an A2 page, A4 is half an A3 and so on.

The most used of this series is the A4 paper size, which is 210 mm by 297 mm and thus almost exactly 1/16 square metre (0.0625 m^{2}; 96.8752 sq in) in area. For comparison, the letter paper size commonly used in North America (8 1/2 in × 11 in; 216 mm × 279 mm) is about 6 mm wider and 18 mm shorter than A4. Then, the size of A5 paper is half of A4, i.e. 148 mm × 210 mm.

The geometric rationale for using the square root of 2 is to maintain the aspect ratio of each subsequent rectangle after cutting or folding an A-series sheet in half, perpendicular to the larger side. Given a rectangle with a longer side, L, and a shorter side, S, ensuring that its aspect ratio, L/S, will be the same as that of a rectangle half its size, S/L/2. Therefore, L/S = S/L/2, which reduces to L/S = √2, i.e. an aspect ratio of 1:√2.

Any An paper can be defined as An = L × S, where (measuring in metres to 3 decimal places)
$$\text{A}_n=\begin{cases}
L={2}^{-(2n-1)/4}
\\
S={2}^{-(2n+1)/4}
\end{cases}$$
Therefore;
$$\text{A}_0=\begin{cases}
L={2}^{+1/4}
=1.189\,\text{m}
\\
S={2}^{-1/4}
=0.841\,\text{m}
\end{cases}$$
$$\text{A}_1=\begin{cases}
L={2}^{-1/4}
=0.841\,\text{m}
\\
S={2}^{-3/4}
=0.595\,\text{m}
\end{cases}$$
$$\text{A}_2=\begin{cases}
L={2}^{-3/4}
=0.595\,\text{m}
\\
S={2}^{-5/4}
=0.420\,\text{m}
\end{cases}$$
$$\text{A}_3=\begin{cases}
L={2}^{-5/4}
=0.420\,\text{m}
\\
S={2}^{-7/4}
=0.297\,\text{m}
\end{cases}$$
$$\text{A}_4=\begin{cases}
L={2}^{-7/4}
=0.297\,\text{m}
\\
S={2}^{-9/4}
=0.210\,\text{m}
\end{cases}$$
etc.

=== B series ===
The B series is defined in the standard as follows: "A subsidiary series of sizes is obtained by placing the geometrical means between adjacent sizes of the A series in sequence." The use of the geometric mean makes each step in size: B0, A0, B1, A1, B2 ... smaller than the previous one by the same factor. As with the A series, the lengths of the B series have the ratio √2, and folding one in half (and rounding down to the nearest millimetre) gives the next in the series. The shorter side of B0 is exactly 1 m.

There is also an incompatible Japanese B series which the JIS defines to have 1.5 times the area of the corresponding JIS A series (which is identical to the ISO A series). Thus, the lengths of JIS B series paper are √1.5 ≈ 1.22 times those of A-series paper. By comparison, the lengths of ISO B series paper are ^{4}√2 ≈ 1.19 times those of A-series paper (and √2 ≈ 1.41 times the area).

Any Bn paper (according to the ISO standard) can be defined as Bn = L × S, where (measuring in metres to 3 decimal places)
$$\text{B}_n=\begin{cases}
L={2}^{-(n-1)/2}
\\
S={2}^{-n/2}
\end{cases}$$
Therefore;
$$\text{B}_0=\begin{cases}
L={2}^{+1/2}
=1.414\,\text{m}
\\
S={2}^{+0/2}
=1.000\,\text{m}
\end{cases}$$
$$\text{B}_1=\begin{cases}
L={2}^{+0/2}
=1.000\,\text{m}
\\
S={2}^{-1/2}
=0.707\,\text{m}
\end{cases}$$
$$\text{B}_2=\begin{cases}
L={2}^{-1/2}
=0.707\,\text{m}
\\
S={2}^{-2/2}
=0.500\,\text{m}
\end{cases}$$
$$\text{B}_3=\begin{cases}
L={2}^{-2/2}
=0.500\,\text{m}
\\
S={2}^{-3/2}
=0.354\,\text{m}
\end{cases}$$
$$\text{B}_4=\begin{cases}
L={2}^{-3/2}
=0.354\,\text{m}
\\
S={2}^{-4/2}
=0.250\,\text{m}
\end{cases}$$
etc.

=== C series ===
The C series formats are geometric means between the B series and A series formats with the same number (e.g. C2 is the geometric mean between B2 and A2). The width to height ratio of C series formats is √2 as in the A and B series. A, B, and C series of paper fit together as part of a geometric progression, with ratio of successive side lengths of ^{8}√2, though there is no size half-way between Bn and A(n − 1): A4, C4, B4, "D4", A3, ...; there is such a D-series in the Swedish extensions to the system. The lengths of ISO C series paper are therefore ^{8}√2 ≈ 1.09 times those of A-series paper.

The C series formats are used mainly for envelopes. An unfolded A4 page will fit into a C4 envelope. Due to same width to height ratio, if an A4 page is folded in half so that it is A5 in size, it will fit into a C5 envelope (which will be the same size as a C4 envelope folded in half).

Any Cn paper can be defined as Cn = L × S, where (measuring in metres to 3 decimal places)
$$\text{C}_n=\begin{cases}
L={2}^{-(4n-3)/8}
\\
S={2}^{-(4n+1)/8}
\end{cases}$$
Therefore;
$$\text{C}_0=\begin{cases}
L={2}^{+3/8}
=1.297\,\text{m}
\\
S={2}^{-1/8}
=0.917\,\text{m}
\end{cases}$$
$$\text{C}_1=\begin{cases}
L={2}^{-1/8}
=0.917\,\text{m}
\\
S={2}^{-5/8}
=0.648\,\text{m}
\end{cases}$$
$$\text{C}_2=\begin{cases}
L={2}^{-5/8}
=0.648\,\text{m}
\\
S={2}^{-9/8}
=0.459\,\text{m}
\end{cases}$$
$$\text{C}_3=\begin{cases}
L={2}^{-9/8}
=0.459\,\text{m}
\\
S={2}^{-13/8}
=0.324\,\text{m}
\end{cases}$$
$$\text{C}_4=\begin{cases}
L={2}^{-13/8}
=0.324\,\text{m}
\\
S={2}^{-17/8}
=0.229\,\text{m}
\end{cases}$$
etc.

== Tolerances ==
The tolerances specified in the standard are:

- ±1.5 mm for dimensions up to 150 mm,
- ±2.0 mm for dimensions in the range 150 to 600 mm, and
- ±3.0 mm for dimensions above 600 mm.

These are related to comparison between series A, B and C.

== Application ==
The ISO 216 formats are organized around the ratio 1:√2; two sheets next to each other together have the same ratio, sideways.

In scaled photocopying, for example, two A4 sheets reduced to A5 size fit exactly onto one A4 sheet, and an A4 sheet in magnified size onto an A3 sheet; in each case, there is neither waste nor want.

The principal countries not generally using the ISO paper sizes are the United States and Canada, which use North American paper sizes. Although many Latin American countries have also officially adopted the ISO 216 paper format, Mexico, Panama, Peru, Colombia, the Philippines, and Chile also use mostly U.S. paper sizes.

Rectangular sheets of paper with the ratio 1:√2 are popular in paper folding, such as origami, where they are sometimes called "A4 rectangles" or "silver rectangles". In other contexts, the term "silver rectangle" can also refer to a rectangle in the proportion 1:(1 + √2), known as the silver ratio.

== Matching technical pen widths ==
Rotring Rapidographs in ISO nib sizes

An adjunct to the ISO paper sizes, particularly the A series, are the technical drawing line widths specified in ISO 128. For example, line type A ("Continuous – thick", used for "visible outlines") has a standard thickness of 0.7 mm on an A0-sized sheet, 0.5 mm on an A1 sheet, and 0.35 mm on A2, A3, or A4.

The matching technical pen widths are 0.13, 0.18, 0.25, 0.35, 0.5, 0.7, 1.0, 1.40, and 2.0 mm, as specified in ISO 9175-1. Colour codes are assigned to each size to facilitate easy recognition by the drafter. Like the paper sizes, these pen widths increase by a factor of √2, so that particular pens can be used on particular sizes of paper, and then the next smaller or larger size can be used to continue the drawing after it has been reduced or enlarged, respectively.

Line width (mm)	0.10	0.13	0.18	0.25	0.35	0.50	0.70	1.0	1.4	2.0
Colour	Maroon	Violet	Red	White	Yellow	Brown	Blue	Orange	Green	Gray

Micronorm logo

The earlier DIN 6775 standard upon which ISO 9175-1 is based also specified a term and symbol for easy identification of pens and drawing templates compatible with the standard, called Micronorm, which may still be found on some technical drafting equipment.

== Overformats ==
DIN 476 provides for formats larger than A0, denoted by a prefix factor. In particular, it lists the formats 2A0 and 4A0, which are twice and four times the size of A0 respectively:

DIN 476 overformats (with rounded inch values)
Name	mm × mm	inch × inch
4A0	1682 × 2378	66 5/24 × 93 5/8
2A0	1189 × 1682	46 19/24 × 66 5/24

While not formally defined, ISO 216:2007 notes them in the table of Main series of trimmed sizes (ISO A series) as well: "The rarely used sizes [2A0 and 4A0] which follow also belong to this series." 2A0 is also known by other unofficial names like "A00".

== See also ==
- ANSI/ASME Y14.1
- International standard envelope sizes
- Paper density
