= Die Brücke (institute) =

German advocacy institute

Die Brücke (German pronunciation: [diː ˈbʁʏkə], "The Bridge") was an advocacy institute founded in Munich, Germany, in 1911. The official name was Die Brücke - Internationales Institut zur Organisierung der geistigen Arbeit (The Bridge - International institute to organise intellectual work).

== Description ==
Die Brücke was founded by Karl Wilhelm Bührer and Adolf Saager. It was essentially supported by Wilhelm Ostwald. Amongst other supporters were Svante Arrhenius and Wilhelm Erner. Paul Otlet was named Honorary President.

The Bridge tried to build a comprehensive, illustrated encyclopedia on sheets of standardized formats. Its aim was to improve and organize scholarly information and communication. The following tasks were mentioned and (partially) carried out:

- to make a world archive of published material, especially from journals, catalogues, advertising material etc. It is mentioned that the Music and Theater section alone contained over 1 million items.
- to be the source of information for exhibits and other activities
- to become a college of organisation and organisation management
- to publish a bi-weekly journal, Die Brückenzeitung. The journal had runs of 6.000 to 10.000 copies and was distributed either freely (reference 1) or for 10 Mark/year . Publication ceased when Die Brücke went bankrupt in 1913.
- to set world standards for published material

The archive seems to have existed, but was destroyed after Die Brücke went bankrupt. The college never started, the journal was published and a world standard was set.

== Weltformat - World Standard ==
One of the main tasks of Die Brücke was to make a world standard for published materials. This was a new idea at the time. The idea was very simple and was based on two rules:

- each standard size would be a rectangle with a dimensional ratio of √2
- each successive standard size would double in area, beginning with 1.41 cm^{2}

The standards were named World Standards (Weltformat) I-XVI and had the following sizes:

- I : 1 x 1.41 cm
- II : 1.41 x 2 cm
- III : 2 x 2.83 cm
- IV : 2.83 x 4 cm
- V : 4 x 5.66 cm
- VI : 5.66 x 8 cm — The standards I–VI were meant for labels, tickets, stamps, ex-libris and similar small items.
- VII : 8 x 11.3 cm
- VIII : 11.3 x 16 cm
- IX : 16 x 22.6 cm
- X : 22.6 x 32 cm — The standards VIII–X were meant for small books, leaflets and similar publications.
- XI : 32 x 45.3 cm
- XII : 45.3 x 64 cm
- XIII : 64 x 90.5 cm
- XIV : 90.5 x 128 cm
- XV : 128 x 181 cm
- XVI : 181 x 256 cm

The institute wanted to promote their new standard by having advertisements and other items being printed in their format. They thus approached influential businessmen to adopt their standard. One of these was Ludwig Roselius, founder of the Coffee Hag company. Karl Wilhelm Bührer approached the heraldic artist Otto Hupp and together with Roselius they started a large publication on German (and later foreign) arms of towns, cities and villages (known as the Coffee Hag albums). In the Coffee Hag packages coupons were added, for which one could obtain stamps with the arms of a town or city. These stamps could be glued in the albums. The stamps were printed in Weltformat V, the albums in Weltformat IX. These standards were also mentioned on the stamps and in the books to promote the idea. The series were issued long after the Brücke was abolished, and in the second edition of the German albums the referral to the Weltformat was removed. The size of the stamps, however, remained identical in all European albums until the 1950s. The Swiss stamps still used the text Weltformat V until the mid-1920s.

The Brücke went bankrupt in 1913 and was abolished in 1914. The idea for a world standard was taken over by the DIN institute in 1922 and the present A1-A6 standard paper sizes are based on the same idea as the World standards of Die Brücke.
