= ANSI/ASME Y14.1 =

American standard for paper sizes

A size chart illustrating the ANSI sizes

In 1992, the American National Standards Institute adopted ANSI/ASME Y14.1 Decimal Inch Drawing Sheet Size and Format, which defined a regular series of paper sizes based upon the de facto standard 8 1/2 in × 11 in "letter" size to which it assigned the designation "ANSI A". This series also includes "ledger"/"tabloid" as "ANSI B". This series is somewhat similar to the ISO 216 standard in that cutting a sheet in half would produce two sheets of the next smaller size. Unlike the ISO standard, however, the arbitrary aspect ratio forces this series to have two alternating aspect ratios.

ANSI/ASME Y14.1 has been revised or updated in 1995, 2005, 2012 and 2022. It had an accompanying standard, ANSI/ASME Y14.1M, that defined metric drawing paper sizes based upon ISO 216 and ISO 5457. ASME Y14.1 and ASME Y14.1M have now been revised and consolidated into one document, ASME Y14.1-2020, Drawing Sheet Size and Format, published on 18 December 2020.

With care, documents can be prepared so that the text and images fit on either ANSI or their equivalent ISO sheets at 1:1 reproduction scale.

ANSI/ASME Y14.1 inch-based drawing paper sizes
Name	in × in	mm × mm	Ratio	Alias	Similar ISO A size
ANSI A	8 1/2 × 11	216 × 279	22/17 = 1.2941	Letter	A4
ANSI B	11 × 17	279 × 432	17/11 = 1.5455	Ledger	A3
ANSI C	17 × 22	432 × 559	22/17 = 1.2941		A2
ANSI D	22 × 34	559 × 864	17/11 = 1.5455		A1
ANSI E	34 × 44	864 × 1118	22/17 = 1.2941		A0
ANSI F	28 × 40	711 × 1016	10/7 = 1.4286		A0
ANSI G	11 × 22.5–90	279 × 572–2286	—N/a		
ANSI H	28 × 44–143	711 × 1118–3632	—N/a		
ANSI J	34 × 55–176	864 × 1397–4470	—N/a		
ANSI K	40 × 55–143	1016 × 1397–3632	—N/a		

Size F does not continue the alphabetic series, because it does not exhibit the same aspect ratios.

Sizes G, H, J and K are roll formats. G size is 11 in (279.4 mm) high, but variable width up to 90 in (2286 mm) in increments of 8 1/2 in. Such sheets were at one time used for full-scale layouts of aircraft parts, wiring harnesses and the like, but today are generally not needed, due to widespread use of computer-aided design (CAD) and computer-aided manufacturing (CAM).

ANSI/ASME Y14.1M metric drawing paper sizes
Name	mm × mm	Ratio
A0	841 × 1189	√2:1
A1	594 × 841	√2:1
A2	420 × 594	√2:1
A3	297 × 420	√2:1
A4	210 × 297	√2:1
A1.0	594 × 1189	2:1
A2.1	420 × 841	2:1
A2.0	420 × 1189	2√2:1
A3.2	297 × 594	2:1
A3.1	297 × 841	2√2:1
A3.0	297 × 1189	4:1

== See also ==
- Product data management – Use of tools to track data related to a product
