= Lectionary 209 =

Lectionary ℓ 209
- New Testament manuscript
- Text: Evangelistarium †
- Date: 12th century
- Script: Greek
- Now at: Bodleian Library
- Size: 24.3 cm by 19.5 cm
- Note: beautiful copy

Lectionary 209, designated by siglum ℓ 209 (in the Gregory-Aland numbering) is a Greek manuscript of the New Testament, on parchment. Palaeographically it has been assigned to the 12th century. Scrivener labelled it by 216^{evl}. The manuscript is lacunose.

== Description ==
The codex contains lessons from the Gospels of John, Matthew, Luke lectionary (Evangelistarium), on 217 parchment leaves (24.3 cm by 19.5 cm), with some lacunae at the beginning and end. The text is written in Greek minuscule letters, in 21 quires, in two columns per page, 21 lines per page (and more lines). It contains musical notes.

There are daily lessons from Easter to Pentecost.

== History ==
Scrivener dated the manuscript to the 13th century, Gregory dated it to the 12th century. It has been assigned by the INTF to the 12th century.

The manuscript was added to the list of New Testament manuscripts by Scrivener (number 216) and Gregory (number 209). Gregory saw it in 1883.

The manuscript is not cited in the critical editions of the Greek New Testament (UBS3).

The codex is located in the Bodleian Library (Wake 16) at Oxford.

== See also ==
- List of New Testament lectionaries
- Biblical manuscript
- Textual criticism

== Bibliography ==
- Gregory, Caspar René (1900). Textkritik des Neuen Testaments. Vol. 1. Leipzig. p. 404.
