= Markarian 471 =

Seyfert 2 galaxy in the constellation Boötes

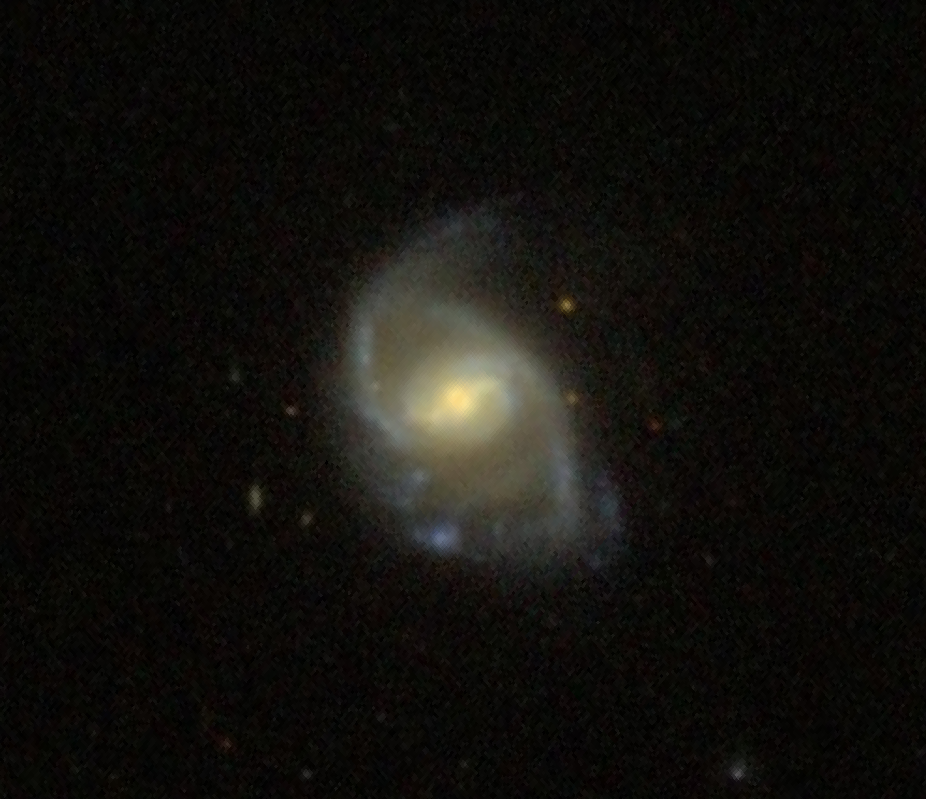
- SDSS image of Markarian 471.

Observation data (J2000 epoch)
- Constellation: Boötes
- Right ascension: 14^{h} 22^{m} 55.33^{s}
- Declination: +32° 51′ 02.43″
- Redshift: 0.034189
- Heliocentric radial velocity: 10,250 km/s ± 2
- Distance: 489 Mly
- Apparent magnitude (V): 14.42
- Apparent magnitude (B): 15.27

Characteristics
- Type: SBa Sy1.8
- Size: ~169,000 ly (51.7 kpc) (estimated)

Other designations
- UGC 9214, CG 0411, CGCG 192-009, MCG +06-32-014, IRAS 14207+3304, PGC 51371, NSA 081577

Markarian 471 also known as MRK 471, is a Type 1 Seyfert galaxy located in the constellation of Boötes. The redshift of the galaxy is (z) 0.0341 and it was first discovered by Thomas F. Adams from a survey of Seyfert galaxies in January 1977.

== Description ==
Markarian 471 is classified as a type SBa barred spiral galaxy or a theta-shaped spiral. The circumnuclear region of the galaxy is found to have a dust obscured appearance with ultraviolet imaging showing a nucleus that is point-like and star forming blob regions that are scattered in all directions with many star clusters.

There is also presence of several dust lanes along the direction of the galaxy's galactic bar, which in turn enters into the circumnuclear region of the galaxy. The spiral arms are suggested to curve in an inwards direction. Dust structures within the stellar bar region are shown to connect together and subsequently going towards the center in a curve formation forming a type GD structure. There is also a nuclear spiral region present with an approximate mass surface density of 16 M_{☉} pc^{−2}.

A multi-wavelength study of the galaxy's spectrum, has found it is a Type 1.9 Seyfert galaxy with a narrow-line region that is extremely reddened. However, there are no signs of any board components that are classified as very variable.

== Supernova ==
One supernova has been observed in Markarian 471:

- SN 2026dds (Type Ia, mag. 19.9161) was discovered by the Zwicky Transient Facility on 7 February 2026.
