= Lectionary 213 =

Lectionary ℓ 213
- New Testament manuscript
- Text: Evangelistarium
- Date: 13th century
- Script: Greek
- Now at: Bodleian Library
- Size: 30.5 cm by 24 cm
- Note: elegant copy

Lectionary 213, designated by siglum ℓ 213 (in the Gregory-Aland numbering), is a Greek manuscript of the New Testament, on parchment. Palaeographically it has been assigned to the 13th century. Scrivener labelled it by 220^{evl}. The manuscript has complex context.

== Description ==
The codex contains lessons from the Gospels of John, Matthew, Luke lectionary (Evangelistarium), on 256 parchment leaves (30.5 cm by 24 cm). The text is written in Greek minuscule letters, in 25 quires, in two columns per page, 25 lines per page. It contains musical notes and Menologion. The last page contains the text of Mark 16:9-20. According to Scrivener it is an elegant copy.

There are weekday Gospel lessons.

== History ==
The manuscript was written in Constantinople.

Scrivener dated the manuscript to the 11th century, Gregory dated it to the 13th century. It has been assigned by the Institute for New Testament Textual Research to the 13th century.

The manuscript was added to the list of New Testament manuscripts by Scrivener (number 220) and Gregory (number 213). Gregory saw it in 1883.

The manuscript is not cited in the critical editions of the Greek New Testament (UBS3).

The codex is located in the Bodleian Library (Wake 23) at Oxford.

== See also ==
- List of New Testament lectionaries
- Biblical manuscript
- Textual criticism

== Bibliography ==
- Gregory, Caspar René (1900). Textkritik des Neuen Testaments. Vol. 1. Leipzig. p. 405.
