= Lectionary 212 =

Lectionary ℓ 212
- New Testament manuscript
- Text: Evangelistarium †
- Date: 11th century
- Script: Greek
- Now at: Bodleian Library
- Size: 28.4 cm by 21.7 cm

Lectionary 212, designated by siglum ℓ 212 (in the Gregory-Aland numbering) is a Greek manuscript of the New Testament, on parchment. Palaeographically it has been assigned to the 11th century. Scrivener labelled it by 219^{evl}. The manuscript is lacunose.

== Description ==
The codex contains lessons from the Gospels of John, Matthew, Luke lectionary (Evangelistarium), on 248 parchment leaves (28.4 cm by 21.7 cm), with one lacuna (9th leaf). The text is written in Greek minuscule letters, in 20 quires, in two columns per page, 20 lines per page. It contains musical notes. The manuscript is ornamented and rubricated.

There are daily lessons from Easter to Pentecost.

== History ==
The manuscript was written in Constantinople.

Scrivener dated the manuscript to the 13th or 14th century, Gregory dated it to the 12th or 13th century. It has been assigned by the Institute for New Testament Textual Research to the 11th century.

The manuscript was added to the list of New Testament manuscripts by Scrivener (number 219) and Gregory (number 212). Gregory saw it in 1883.

The manuscript is not cited in the critical editions of the Greek New Testament (UBS3).

Che codex is located in the Bodleian Library (Wake 19) at Oxford.

== See also ==
- List of New Testament lectionaries
- Biblical manuscript
- Textual criticism

== Bibliography ==
- Gregory, Caspar René (1900). Textkritik des Neuen Testaments. Vol. 1. Leipzig. p. 405.
