= Cavern Flooring =

Role-playing game supplement

Cavern Flooring is a supplement for fantasy role-playing games published by Sacred Band Publications.

== Contents ==
Cavern Floorings is a package of twelve A4 sheets made of thin card stock, which are designed to look like a plan view of a subterranean area.

== Reception ==
Doug Cowie reviewed Cavern Flooring for Imagine magazine, and stated that "The designers have shown a constructive approach when faced with my criticisms. They tell me that the thin card is deliberate because the flexibility of the system necessitates the overlapping of pieces, which would not be feasible with thick card."
