= Card stock =

Paper, thicker and more durable than normal writing or printing paper

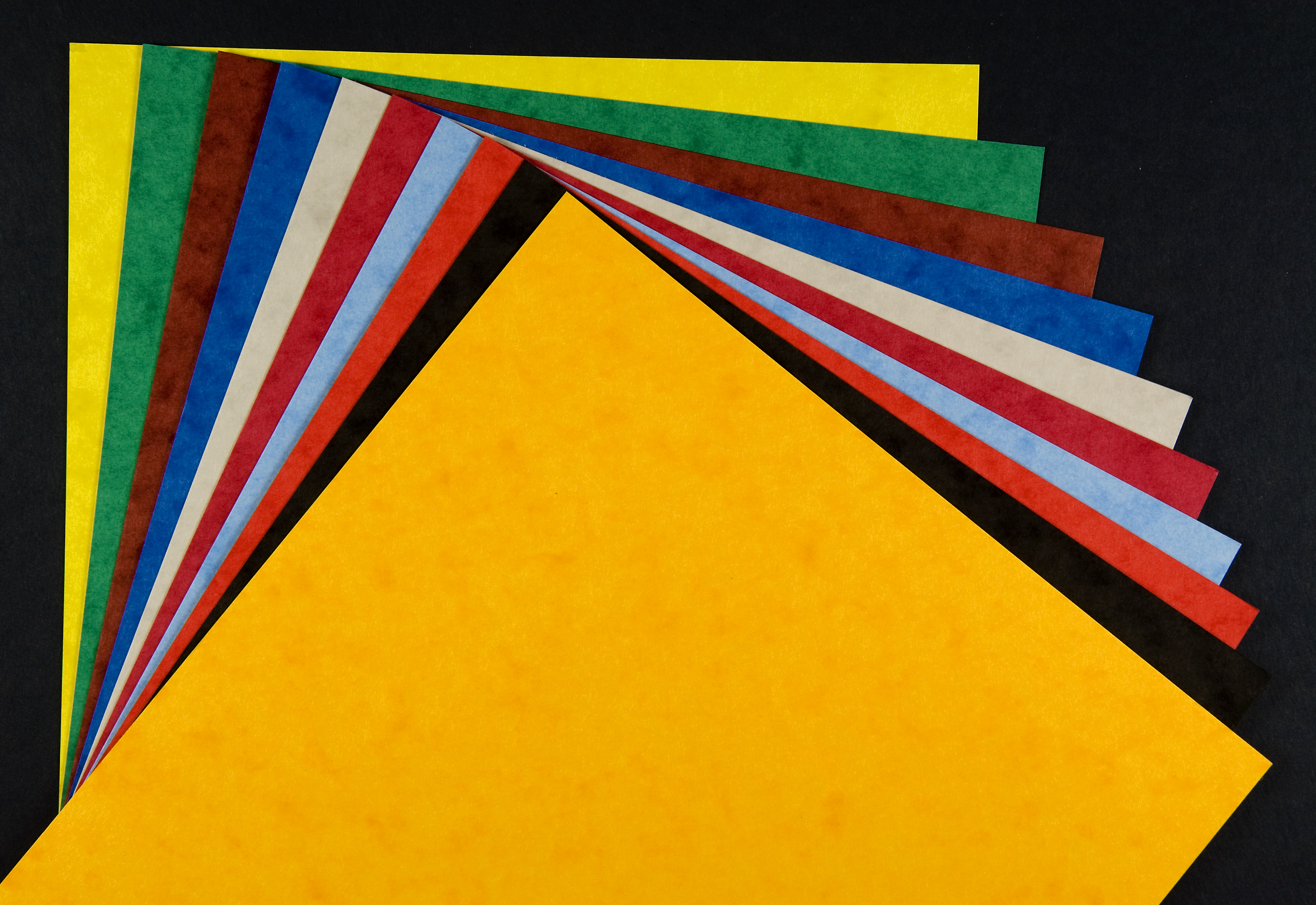
Card stock for craft use comes in a wide variety of textures and colors.

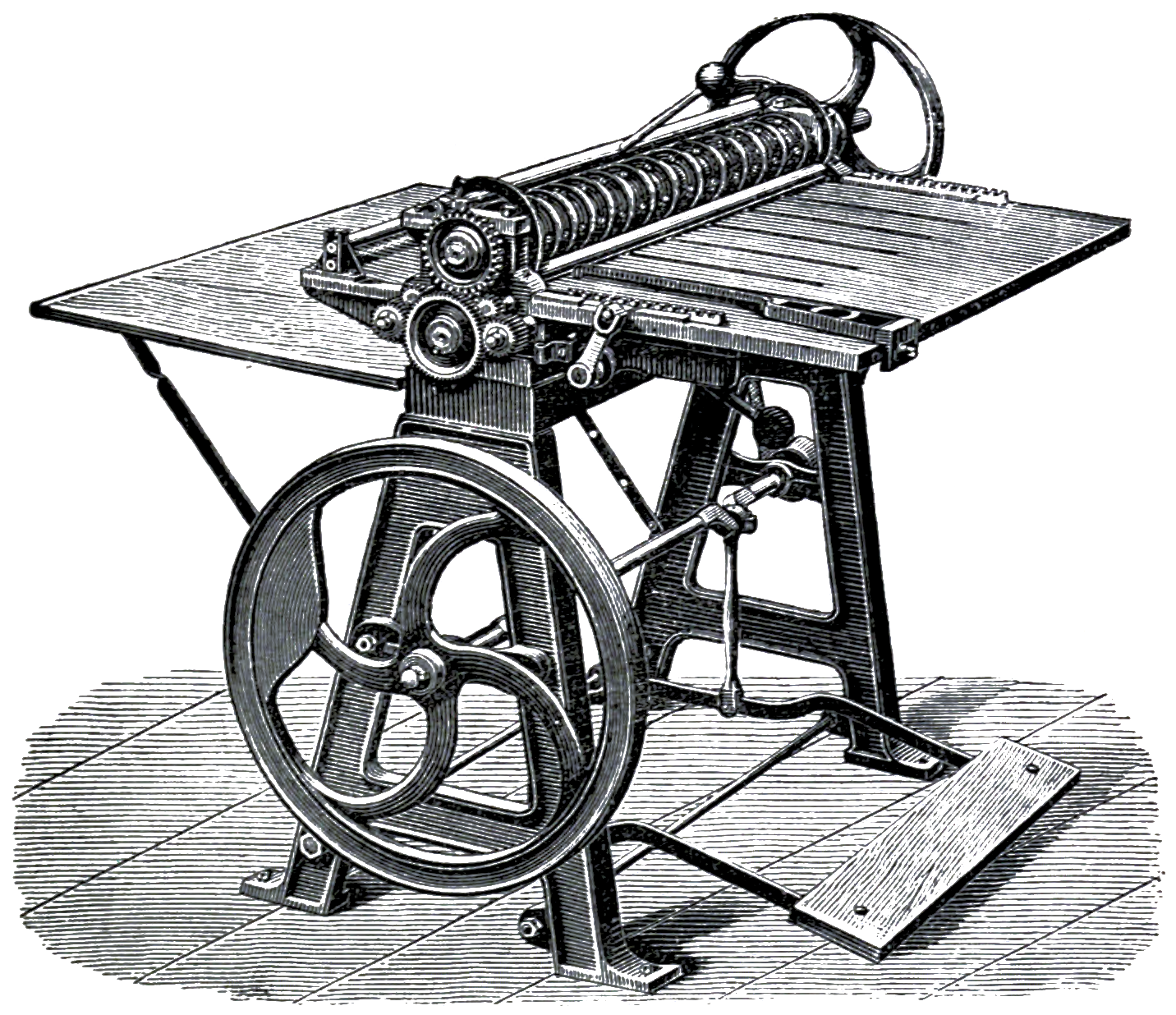
An Oscar Friedheim card cutting and scoring machine from 1889

Card stock, also called cover stock and pasteboard, is paper that is thicker and more durable than normal writing and printing paper, but thinner and more flexible than other forms of paperboard.

== Use ==
Card stock is often used for business cards, postcards, folders, playing cards, scrapbooking, and other applications requiring more durability than regular paper gives. The surface usually is smooth; it may be textured, metallic, or glossy. Common surface finishes include wove (smooth), laid (parallel ribbing produced by a dandy roll), felt (a textured surface), and embossed patterns such as cordwain and linen. When card stock is labeled cover stock, it often has a glossy coating on one or both sides (C1S or C2S, for "coated: one side" or "coated: two sides"); this is used especially in business cards and book covers.

== Measurements ==
The weight of cardstock ranges from 50# to 110# (about 135 to 300 g/m^{2}). (Note: Most nations describe paper in terms of grammage—the weight in grams of one sheet of the paper measuring one square meter. Other people, especially in the United States, describe paper in terms of pound weight—the weight in pounds per ream (500 sheets) of the paper with a given area (based on historical production sizes before trimming). For card stock, this is 20 by 26 in (508 by 660 mm); as compared to newsprint (thinner paper) of 24 by 36 in (610 by 914 mm). In describing paper, the pound is often symbolized by the pound symbol, #. Because of the difference in the way pound weight is determined, a sheet of 65# card stock is thicker and heavier than a sheet of 80# newsprint.)

The length and width of card stock often are stated in terms of the ISO system of paper sizes, in which specific dimensions are implied by numbers prefixed with the letter A. Card stock labeled A3, for example, measures 420 × 297 mm (16.5 × 11.7 in). (Note: Rather than as a function of weight per sheet of a given area, paper thickness can be measured and stated directly, in units of linear measure. In the United States, this usually is expressed in thousandths of an inch, often abbreviated thou points (pt. and pts.) and mils. For example, a 10 pt. card is 0.010 in (0.254 mm) thick (corresponding to a weight of about 250 g/m^{2}), and 12 pt. is 0.012 in (0.3048 mm). The thou point (1/1,000 inch) differs from the typographical point (1/12 traditional pica = exactly 0.01383 inch = 0.35136 mm).)

== See also ==
- Construction paper
- Paper density
