= Quality control system for paper, board and tissue machines =

A quality control system (QCS) refers to a system used to measure and control the quality of moving sheet processes on-line as in the paper produced by a paper machine. Generally, a control system is concerned with measurement and control of one or multiple properties in time in a single dimension. A QCS is designed to continuously measure and control the material properties of the moving sheet in two dimensions: in the machine direction (MD) and the cross-machine direction (CD). The ultimate goal is maintaining a good and homogeneous quality and meeting users' economic goals. A basic quality measurement system generally includes basis weight and moisture profile measurements and in addition average basis weight of the paper web and moisture control related to these variables. Caliper is also one of the basic measurements.

Other commonly used continuous measurements include: ash content, color, brightness, smoothness and gloss, coat weight, formation, porosity, fiber orientation, and surface properties (topography).

QCS is used in paper machines, board machines, tissue machines, pulp drying machines, and other plastic or metal film processes

In modern systems QCS applications can be embedded to distributed control systems.

== Sensor platform ==
Sensors measuring the paper quality (online meters) are attached to a sensor platform that move across the web guided by the scanner beam. A typical crossing time for a sensor platform is 10–30 s (an 8 m web, 60 cm/s). The sensor platform scans across the paper web and continuously measures paper characteristics from edge to edge. It can also be directed and stopped to a specific, fixed point on the web to measure the machine-direction (MD) variation at a single point.

== Scanner beam ==
The QCS scanner beam is an essential part of a QCS system. Wide machines and accurate profile calculations require beam stability and accuracy of mechanical movement. As high accuracy in demanding and variable conditions is required, the sensitive sensors must be securely fastened. The most important goal is maintaining the exact respective position of the upper and lower measurement platforms in relation to their distance from each other, in MD and in CD . This is achieved through a robust construction and by reducing the effects of temperature and other environmental effects and through a moving mechanism with minimized backlash of the measurement platform.

Usually the scanner beam also contains all the cables and the air, cooling liquid and protection gas pipes. The base of the scanner beam contains elements that dampen vertical vibration.

== Variables to be measured ==
A basic quality measurement system generally includes basis weight and moisture profile measurements and in addition average basis weight of the paper web and moisture control related to these variables. Caliper is also one of the basic measurements.

Other commonly used continuous measurements include: ash content, color, brightness, smoothness and gloss, coat weight, formation, porosity, fiber orientation, and surface properties (topography).

== Measurement process ==
Online sensors are set on the scanner beam to scan across the web. Typical crossing time of the web in new systems is 10–30 s (8m web, 60 cm/s). If the web speed is 1200 m/min and web width 8.5 m, the web moves 280 m during a scan, and the sensor moves the same distance diagonally across the web. The measurements are taken on the diagonal line and act as basis for profile (machine and cross-direction) and variation calculations. This value is subject to integration depending on the machine speed. If the measurement signal sampling frequency is in size range 2000/s, then the smallest measurement element is about 0.2 cm in cross-direction. The measurement data is integrated to eliminate a small-scale formation variation from the measurement result.

The measurement value is averaged so that each sensor gives one measurement value per one data box which is typically from 5 mm to one centimeter of web width. For a 1 meter wide web, for instance, 100 - 200 measurement values are taken. These measurement values from a single scan (profile points) are called 'raw profiles'. In modern quality control systems, the width of these data boxes can be changed, and accurate profiles can be formed using several thousands profile data boxes.

Typically, the sensor's output is the instantaneous value, the profile average value and the complete profile.

== Sensor requirements ==
The requirements for an ideal paper machine online sensor include the following: the sensor is calibrated to a natural constant during the measurement; the sensor and the related electronics include fault diagnostics; digital processing of the signal is possible from the start without destroying the possibility of analyzing large frequency components; the sensor system does not disturb the production; the measurements are performed real-time and can be adjusted without delays; the measurement concerns the entire production, not just small sample values. It must be possible to distinguish between the machine-directional and cross-directional deviation and the residual deviation as the control system handles these three deviations separately and in different ways. The earlier systems calculated a long-term average profile to filter the profile. As several quality profiles can be adjusted automatically it is important to get the right profile data with high resolution quickly to the control system. This is especially important during changes, after breaks and during grade changes. In advanced systems, algorithms are used to calculate the profile data.

== See also ==
- Distributed Control System
- Programmable logic controller (PLC)
- Safety instrumented system (SIS)
- Industrial control systems
