= Area density =

Mass per unit area

- Common symbols: $\rho_A$
- SI unit: kg/m^{2}
- In SI base units: m^{−2}⋅kg
- Derivations from other quantities: $\rho_A = \frac {m} {A}$; $\rho_A = \rho l$
- Dimension: $\mathsf{L}^{-2} \mathsf{M}$

The area density (also known as areal density, surface density, superficial density, column density, or density thickness) of a two-dimensional object is defined as the quotient of mass by area. The SI derived unit is the "kilogram per square metre" (unit symbol kg·m^{−2}).

In the paper and fabric industries, it is called grammage and is expressed in grams per square meter (g/m^{2}); for paper in particular, it may be expressed as pounds per ream of standard sizes ("basis ream").

A generalized areic quantity is defined as the quotient of a generic physical quantity by area, such as surface charge density or areic electric charge. A related area number density can be defined by replacing mass by number of particles or other countable quantity.

== Formulation ==
Area density can be calculated as:
$$\rho_A = \frac {m} {A}$$
or
$$\rho_A = \rho \cdot l,$$
where ρ_{A} is the average area density, m is the total mass of the object, A is the total area of the object, ρ is the average density, and l is the average thickness of the object.

== Column density ==
A special type of area density is called column density (also columnar mass density or simply column density), denoted ρ_{A} or σ. It is the mass of substance per unit area integrated along a path; It is obtained integrating volumetric density $\rho$ over a column:
$$\sigma=\int \rho \, \mathrm{d}s.$$

In general the integration path can be slant or oblique incidence (as in, for example, line of sight propagation in atmospheric physics). A common special case is a vertical path, from the bottom to the top of the medium:
$$\sigma = \int \rho \, \mathrm{d}z,$$
where $z$ denotes the vertical coordinate (e.g., height or depth).

Columnar density $\rho_A$ is closely related to the vertically averaged volumetric density $\bar{\rho}$ as
$$\bar{\rho} = \frac{\rho_A}{\Delta z},$$
where $\Delta z = \int 1 \, \mathrm{d}z$; $\bar{\rho}$, $\rho_A$, and $\Delta z$ have units of, for example, grams per cubic metre, grams per square metre, and metres, respectively.

== Usage ==
=== Atmospheric physics ===
It is a quantity commonly retrieved by remote sensing instruments, such as the Total Ozone Mapping Spectrometer (TOMS), which retrieves ozone columns around the globe. Columns are also returned by the differential optical absorption spectroscopy (DOAS) method and are a common retrieval product from nadir-looking microwave radiometers.

A closely related concept is that of ice or liquid water path, which specifies the volume per unit area or depth instead of mass per unit area, so the two are related:
$$P = \frac{\sigma}{\rho_0}.$$

Another closely related concept is optical depth.

=== Astronomy ===
In astronomy, the column density is generally used to indicate the number of atoms or molecules per square cm (cm^{2}) along the line of sight in a particular direction, as derived from observations of e.g. the 21 cm hydrogen line or from observations of a certain molecular species. Also the interstellar extinction can be related to the column density of H or H_{2}.

The concept of area density can be useful when analysing accretion disks. In the case of a disk seen face-on, area density for a given area of the disk is defined as column density: that is, either as the mass of substance per unit area integrated along the vertical path that goes through the disk (line-of-sight), from the bottom to the top of the medium:

$$\sigma = \int \rho \, \mathrm{d}z,$$

where $z$ denotes the vertical coordinate (e.g., height or depth), or as the number or count of a substance—rather than the mass—per unit area integrated along a path (column number density):

$$N = \int n \, \mathrm{d}z.$$

=== Data storage media ===
Areal density is used to quantify and compare different types media used in data storage devices such as hard disk drives, optical disc drives and tape drives. The current unit of measure is typically gigabits per square inch.

=== Paper ===
The area density is often used to describe the thickness of paper; e.g., 80 g/m^{2} is very common.

=== Fabric ===
Fabric "weight" is often specified as mass per unit area, grams per square meter (gsm) or ounces per square yard. It is also sometimes specified in ounces per yard in a standard width for the particular cloth. One gram per square meter equals 0.0295 ounces per square yard; one ounce per square yard equals 33.9 grams per square meter.

=== Other ===
It is also an important quantity for the absorption of radiation.

When studying bodies falling through air, area density is important because resistance depends on area, and gravitational force is dependent on mass.

Bone density is often expressed in grams per square centimeter (g·cm^{−2}) as measured by x-ray absorptiometry, as a proxy for the actual density.

The body mass index is expressed in units of kilograms per square meter, though the area figure is nominal, being the square of the height.

The total electron content in the ionosphere is a quantity of type columnar number density.

Snow water equivalent is a quantity of type columnar mass density.

== Generalization: areic quantities ==
The qualifier areic is recommended in the International System of Quantities (ISO 80000-1) to denote the quotient of any physical quantity by area. The expressions "per unit area" or "surface ... density" (or simply "density") are also often used, with resulting units involving reciprocal square metre (m^{−2}), for example:

- surface mass density or areic mass
- volume per area or areic volume, as in rainfall
- surface charge density or areic electric charge, electric charge per unit area
- surface current density or areic electric current, the quotient of electric current to area
- surface magnetic flux density or areic magnetic flux
- surface activity density or areic activity
- heat flow rate density or areic heat flow rate
- surface power density, power per unit area
- specific surface energy, free energy per unit surface are

== See also ==
- Linear density
- Paper density
