= Grammage =

Mass per unit of area of paper

Grammage and basis weight, in the pulp and paper industry, are measures of the area density of a paper product, that is, its mass per unit of area. Two common ways of expressing the area density of a paper product are used:

- Expressed in grams per square metre (g/m^{2}), regardless of its thickness (caliper) (known as grammage). This is the measure used in most parts of the world. It is often notated as gsm on paper product labels and spec sheets.
- Expressed in terms of the mass per number of sheets of a specific paper size (known as basis weight). The convention used in the United States and a few other countries using US-standard paper sizes is pounds (lb) per ream of 500 (or in some cases 1000) sheets of a given (raw, still uncut) basis size. The traditional British practice is pounds per ream of 480, 500, 504, or 516 sheets of a given basis size. Japanese paper is expressed as the weight in kilograms (kg) per 1,000 sheets.

== Grammage ==
In the metric system, the mass per unit area of all types of paper and paperboard is expressed in terms of grams per square metre (g/m^{2}). This quantity is commonly called grammage in both English and French, though printers in most English-speaking countries still refer to the "weight" of paper.

$$\text{Grammage} = \frac{\text{mass} \text{ (g)}}{\text{length} \text{ }(\text{m}) \times \text{width} \text{ } (\text{m})}$$

Typical office paper has 80 g/m^{2} (0.26 oz/sq ft), therefore a typical A4 sheet (1/16 of a square metre) weighs 5 g (0.18 oz). The abbreviation gsm instead of the standard g/m^{2} symbol is also widely encountered in English-speaking countries.

Typically, grammage is measured in paper mill on-line by a quality control system and verified by laboratory measurement.

== Basis weight ==
Basis weight of paper is the density of paper expressed in terms of the mass (in pounds) of a ream of paper of given dimensions and a sheet count. The American and the traditional British systems are largely the same, with only minor differences: the paper dimensions and the sheet count are different.

=== United States ===
In the US system, the weight is specified in avoirdupois pounds, and the sheet count of a paper ream is usually 500 sheets. However, the mass specified is not the mass of the ream that is sold to the customer. Instead, it is the mass of the uncut "basis ream" in which the sheets have a larger size (parent size). Often, that is a size used during the manufacturing process before the paper is cut to the dimensions in which it is sold. So, to compute the mass per area, one must know:

- the mass of the basis ream,
- the number of sheets in that ream, and
- the dimensions of an "uncut" sheet in that ream.

The standard dimensions and sheet count of a ream vary according to the type of paper. These "uncut" basis sizes are not normally labelled on the product, are not formally standardized, and therefore have to be guessed or inferred somehow from trading practice. Historically, this convention is the product of pragmatic considerations such as the size of a sheet mold.

By using the same basis sheet size for the same type of paper, consumers can easily compare papers of differing brands. Twenty-pound bond paper is always lighter and thinner than 32-pound bond, no matter what its cut size, and 20-pound bond letter size and 20-pound bond legal size papers are the same weight paper with a different cut size.

However, a sheet of common copy paper that has a basis weight of 20 pounds (9.1 kg) does not have the same mass as the same size sheet of coarse paper (newsprint). In the former case, the standard ream is 500 sheets of 17 by 22 in (432 by 559 mm) paper, and in the latter, 500 sheets of 24 by 36 in (610 by 914 mm) paper. Here are some basic ream sizes for various types of paper. Units are inches except where noted.

Paper type	Paper size (inches)	Sheets per ream
Bond, writing, ledger	17 × 22	500
Manuscript cover	18 × 31	500
Blotting	19 × 24	500
Box cover	20 × 24	500
Cover	20 × 26	500 or 1000
Watercolour	22 × 30	500
Bristol and tag	22 1/2 × 28 1/2	500
Tissue	24 × 36	480
Newsprint	24 × 36	500
Hanging, waxing, bag, etc.	24 × 36	500
Book, text, offset	25 × 38	500
Index bristol	25 1/2 × 30 1/2	500
Paperboard (all types)	12 × 12	1000 (1000 sq ft per ream)

Sheets 17 by 22 in (432 by 559 mm) can be cut into four 8 1/2 by 11 in (216 by 279 mm) sheets, a standard for business stationery known conventionally as letter sized paper. So, the 17 by 22 in (432 by 559 mm) ream became commonly used. The 25 by 38 in (635 by 965 mm) book-paper ream developed because such a size can easily be cut into sixteen 6 by 9 in (152 by 229 mm) book sized sheets without significant waste (nominally 6 1/4 by 9 1/2 in (159 by 241 mm) before trimming and binding).

Early newsprint presses printed sheets 2 by 3 feet (610 by 914 mm) in size, and so the ream dimensions for newsprint became 24 by 36 inches (610 by 914 mm), with 500 sheets to a ream. Newsprint was made from ground wood pulp, and ground wood hanging paper (wallpaper) was made on newsprint machines. Newsprint was used as wrapping paper, and the first paper bags were made from newsprint. The newsprint ream standard also became the standard for packaging papers, even though in packaging papers kraft pulp, rather than ground wood, was used for greater strength.

Paper weight is sometimes stated using the "#" symbol. For example, "20#" means "20 pounds per basis ream of that kind of paper". When the density of a ream of paper is given in pounds, it is often accompanied by its "M weight" (M is 1000 in Roman numerals). The M weight is the weight (in pounds) of 1000 cut sheets. Paper suppliers will often charge by M weight, since it is always consistent within a specific paper size, and because it allows a simple weight calculation for shipping charges.

For example, a 500-sheet ream of 20# 8 1/2 by 11 in (216 by 279 mm) copy paper may be specified "10 M". 1000 cut sheets (or two reams) will weigh 10 lb (4.5 kg), half of the four reams of cut paper resulting from the 20# basis ream of 17 by 22 in (432 by 559 mm) paper.

=== United Kingdom ===
==== Overview of the traditional British system ====
Like the American system, the traditional British system also involves the use of basis weight to express the area density of paper (and, indirectly, paper thickness) in the course of buying and selling paper. The British paper industry exclusively used basis weight before 1968.

In the traditional British system, basis weight is also expressed in terms of the weight of an imaginary ream of paper of a certain size. The underlying concept is that a ream of paper of the stated paper size and of the same thickness as the paper the parties are dealing with would have the stated weight. The weight is expressed in pound. As to paper sizes (basis sizes), they can, theoretically, be any sizes, but, by custom, a number of common sizes emerged. In the 1960s, even the metric A1 and A2 had been used as basis sizes alongside the British ones.

The following are common British basis sizes (sizes of British uncut paper):

Common British basis sizes
Note 1: The Italicised writing‑paper and printing‑paper sizes were in use only prior to the 1925 standardisation of writing‑paper and printing‑paper sizes. The 1925 standardisation did not apply to wrapping‑paper sizes. Note 2: The underlined writing‑paper and printing‑paper sizes were in use after the 1925 standardisation but were not adopted as standard sizes by British Standards Institution specification number 730 of 1937. Note 3: The wrapping‑paper sizes marked with '*' were not adopted as standard sizes by British Standards Institution specification number 730 of 1937.
Writing paper
Atlas	26 in × 34 in
Copy	16 1/2 in × 20 in
Double elephant (adopted by British Standards Institution specification number 730 of 1937 but not the 1925 standardisation)	27 in × 40 in
Double imperial	30 in × 44 in
Double large post	21 in × 33 in
Double post (adopted by British Standards Institution specification number 730 of 1937 but not the 1925 standardisation)	19 in × 30 in (prior to re‑definition by British Standards Institution specification number 730 of 1937, 19 in × 30 1/2 in)
Double pott	15 in × 25 in
Double small demy (known as 'double demy' before the 1925 standardisation)	20 in × 31 in
Double small foolscap (known as 'double foolscap' before British Standards Institution specification number 730 of 1937) ('foolscap' is sometimes shortened to 'cap')	16 1/2 in × 26 1/2 in
Double small royal (known as 'double royal' before the 1925 standardisation)	24 in × 38 in
Elephant	23 in × 28 in
Imperial	22 in × 30 in
Large post	16 1/2 in × 21 in
Pinched post	14 3/4 in × 18 1/2 in
Post (adopted by British Standards Institution specification number 730 of 1937 but not the 1925 standardisation)	15 in × 19 in (prior to re‑definition by British Standards Institution specification number 730 of 1937, 15 1/4 in × 19 in)
Pott	12 1/2 in × 15 in
Sheet‑and‑a‑half small foolscap (known as 'sheet‑and‑a‑half foolscap' before British Standards Institution specification number 730 of 1937) ('foolscap' is sometimes shortened to 'cap')	13 1/4 in × 24 3/4 in (before the 1925 standardisation, 13 1/4 in × 24 1/2 in)
Sheet‑and‑a‑third small foolscap (introduced by the 1925 standardisation) (known as 'sheet‑and‑a‑third foolscap' before British Standards Institution specification number 730 of 1937) ('foolscap' is sometimes shortened to 'cap')	13 1/4 in × 22 in
Small demy (known as 'demy' before the 1925 standardisation)	15 1/2 in × 20 in
Small foolscap (known as 'foolscap' before British Standards Institution specification number 730 of 1937) ('foolscap' is sometimes shortened to 'cap')	13 1/4 in × 16 1/2 in
Small medium (known as 'medium' before the 1925 standardisation)	17 1/2 in × 22 in
Small post (introduced by the 1925 standardisation)	14 1/2 in × 18 1/2 in
Small royal (known as 'royal' before the 1925 standardisation)	19 in × 24 in
Super royal	19 in × 27 in (before the 1925 standardisation, 19 1/4 in × 27 in)
Printing paper
Copy	16 1/2 in × 20 in
Crown	15 in × 20 in
Demy	17 1/2 in × 22 1/2 in
Double crown	20 in × 30 in
Double demy	22 1/2 in × 35 in
Double elephant (also known as 'double large royal') (adopted by British Standards Institution specification number 730 of 1937 but not the 1925 standardisation)	27 in × 40 in
Double globe	28 in × 38 in
Double imperial	30 in × 44 in
Double foolscap (known as 'double large foolscap' after the 1925 standardisation and before being re‑named by British Standards Institution specification number 730 of 1937) ('foolscap' is sometimes shortened to 'cap')	17 in × 27 in
Double large post	21 in × 33 in
Double medium	23 in × 36 in
Double post (adopted by British Standards Institution specification number 730 of 1937 but not the 1925 standardisation)	19 in × 30 in (prior to re‑definition by British Standards Institution specification number 730 of 1937, 19 1/4 in × 31 1/2 in)
Double pott	15 in × 25 in
Double royal	25 in × 40 in
Elephant	23 in × 28 in
Foolscap (known as 'large foolscap' after the 1925 standardisation and before being re‑named by British Standards Institution specification number 730 of 1937) ('foolscap' is sometimes shortened to 'cap')	13 1/2 in × 17 in
Imperial	22 in × 30 in
Large post	16 1/2 in × 21 in
Large royal (introduced by the 1925 standardisation)	20 1/2 in × 27 in (prior to re‑definition by British Standards Institution specification number 730 of 1937, 20 in × 27 in)
Medium	18 in × 23 in
Music demy	14 3/8 in × 20 3/4 in
Post (adopted by British Standards Institution specification number 730 of 1937 but not the 1925 standardisation)	15 in × 19 in (prior to re‑definition by British Standards Institution specification number 730 of 1937, 15 1/2 in × 19 1/4 in)
Pott	12 1/2 in × 15 in
Quad crown	30 in × 40 in
Quad demy	35 in × 45 in
Quad foolscap (known as 'quad large foolscap' after the 1925 standardisation and before being re‑named by British Standards Institution specification number 730 of 1937) ('foolscap' is sometimes shortened to 'cap')	27 in × 34 in
Quad globe	38 in × 56 in
Quad pott	25 in × 30 in
Quad royal	40 in × 50 in
Royal	20 in × 25 in
Super royal	20 1/2 in × 27 1/2 in
Wrapping paper
Bag cap	20 in × 24 in (prior to re‑definition by British Standards Institution specification number 730 of 1937, 19 1/2 in × 24 in)
Casing	36 in × 46 in (across the island of Ireland, 36 in × 48 in)
Double bag cap*	24 in × 39 in*
Double crown	20 in × 30 in
Double double imperial	45 in × 58 in
Double elephant*	31 in × 46 in*
Double imperial	29 in × 45 in
Double medium	23 in × 36 in
Double small cap*	25 in × 34 in*
Double small hand*	20 in × 29 in*
Elephant*	24 in × 32 in*
Extra large casing	40 in × 48 in
Haven cap* (sometimes called 'havon cap')	21 in × 26 in*
Imperial	22 1/2 in × 29 in
Kent cap*	18 in × 21 in*
Lumber hand*	17 1/2 in × 22 1/2 in*
Quad crown	30 in × 40 in
Quad foolscap* (known as 'quad large foolscap' after the 1925 standardisation and before British Standards Institution specification number 730 of 1937) ('foolscap' is sometimes shortened to 'cap')	27 in × 34 in*
Quad royal*	40 in × 50 in*
Quad small hand*	30 in × 40 in*
Royal*	20 in × 25 in*
Saddleback	36 in × 45 in
Small cap*	17 in × 25 in*
Small hand*	15 in × 20 in*
(No name)	20 in × 24 in*
(No name)	20 in × 28 in*
(No name)	21 in × 31 in*
(No name)	21 in × 34 in*
(No name)	22 in × 32 in*
(No name)	22 in × 35 in*
(No name)	23 in × 34 in*
(No name)	24 in × 30 in*
(No name)	24 in × 36 in*
(No name)	24 in × 40 in*
(No name)	26 in × 36 in*
(No name)	28 in × 45 in*
(No name)	29 in × 44 in*
(No name)	30 in × 38 in*
(No name)	30 in × 46 in*
(No name)	34 in × 36 in*
(No name)	36 in × 36 in*
(No name)	36 in × 48 in*
(No name)	38 in × 48 in*
(No name)	45 in × 56 in*

One ream in the context of basis weight (basis ream) can be 480 sheets, 500 sheets, 504 sheets, or 516 sheets: there is no fixed rule on when a certain definition was applied; however, starting from the 1950s, the trend of moving towards 500 sheets emerged.

Basis weight is commonly expressed in terms of pound per ream of paper of a certain size, in the format of '[number]lb [paper size]' (e. g., '21lb large post' ('21 pounds per ream of large post paper')). Since there are basis reams of different sizes, unless the context leaves no room for ambiguity, the number of sheets in the basis ream is also given after the paper size to avoid misunderstanding: in such case, basis weight is expressed in the format of '[number]lb [paper size] [number of sheets of paper in the basis ream]', such as '21lb large post 480' ('21 pounds per 480‑sheet ream of large post paper'). In the United Kingdom, '#' has never been used to express paper weight because it is called 'hash', instead of 'pound', in British English.

Demy traditionally plays the role of the default basis size for expressing basis weights: in the British paper industry, there was a device, called 'demy scale', that was used to measure the weights of different paper samples in pound per ream of demy paper (480‑sheet, 500‑sheet, and 516‑sheet reams).

Below is a list of common basis weights of paper stocked by British paper merchants:

Common British basis weights and their metric and American equivalents
Writing paper
Common British basis weights (various paper sizes and ream sizes)	Equivalent weight of a 500‑sheet ream of large post paper, a British uncut writing paper commonly used to express the basis weight of writing paper (rounded to the nearest quarter) (a common British basis for intra‑category comparison)	Equivalent weight of a 500‑sheet ream of demy paper, a British uncut printing paper commonly used by default to express the basis weight of different types of paper (Note: The pound per ream of demy paper has been chosen as the common unit for comparing the basis weights of paper in all three categories in this table, since there is a tradition of using demy as the default paper size for basis weight: in the British paper industry, there was a device, called 'demy scale', that was used to measure the weights of paper samples in pound per ream of demy paper (480‑sheet, 500‑sheet, and 516‑sheet reams).) (rounded to the nearest quarter) (a common British basis for cross‑category comparison)	Equivalent grammage (rounded to the nearest one)	Equivalent weight of a 500‑sheet ream of bond paper, an American uncut paper commonly used to express the basis weight of paper (rounded to the nearest quarter) (a common American basis for cross‑category comparison)
11lb large post 480	11 1/2lb large post	13lb demy	46gsm	12 1/4lb bond
11lb large post 500	11lb large post	12 1/2lb demy	45gsm	11 3/4lb bond
12lb large post 500	12lb large post	13 1/2lb demy	49gsm	13lb bond
14lb large post 480	14 1/2lb large post	16 1/2lb demy	59gsm	15 3/4lb bond
15lb large post 480	15 3/4lb large post	17 3/4lb demy	63gsm	16 3/4lb bond
15lb large post 500	15lb large post	17lb demy	61gsm	16 1/4lb bond
15lb large post 504	15lb large post	17lb demy	60gsm	16lb bond
17lb large post 480	17 3/4lb large post	20lb demy	72gsm	19lb bond
18lb large post 480	18 3/4lb large post	21 1/2lb demy	76gsm	20 1/4lb bond
18lb large post 500	18lb large post	20 1/2lb demy	73gsm	19 1/2lb bond
18lb large post 504	17 3/4lb large post	20 1/4lb demy	72gsm	19 1/4lb bond
19lb large post 480	19 3/4lb large post	22 1/2lb demy	80gsm	21 1/4lb bond
20lb large post 480	20 3/4lb large post	23 3/4lb demy	85gsm	22 1/2lb bond
21lb large post 480	22lb large post	24 3/4lb demy	89gsm	23 1/2lb bond
21lb large post 500	21lb large post	23 3/4lb demy	85gsm	22 3/4lb bond
21lb large post 504	20 3/4lb large post	23 3/4lb demy	85gsm	22 1/2lb bond
22lb large post 480	23lb large post	26lb demy	93gsm	24 3/4lb bond
22lb large post 504	21 3/4lb large post	24 3/4lb demy	89gsm	23 1/2lb bond
23lb large post 480	24lb large post	27 1/4lb demy	97gsm	25 3/4lb bond
23lb large post 500	23lb large post	26 1/4lb demy	93gsm	24 3/4lb bond
23lb large post 504	22 3/4lb large post	26lb demy	93gsm	24 1/2lb bond
24lb large post 480	25lb large post	28 1/2lb demy	101gsm	27lb bond
24lb large post 504	23 3/4lb large post	27lb demy	97gsm	25 3/4lb bond
25lb large post 480	26lb large post	29 1/2lb demy	106gsm	28lb bond
25lb large post 500	25lb large post	28 1/2lb demy	101gsm	27lb bond
26lb large post 480	27lb large post	30 3/4lb demy	110gsm	29 1/4lb bond
26lb large post 504	25 3/4lb large post	29 1/4lb demy	105gsm	27 3/4lb bond
27lb large post 480	28 1/4lb large post	32lb demy	114gsm	30 1/4lb bond
27lb large post 504	26 3/4lb large post	30 1/2lb demy	109gsm	29lb bond
28lb large post 480	29 1/4lb large post	33 1/4lb demy	118gsm	31 1/2lb bond
28lb large post 504	27 3/4lb large post	31 1/2lb demy	113gsm	30lb bond
30lb large post 480	31 1/4lb large post	35 1/2lb demy	127gsm	33 3/4lb bond
22lb double large post 500	11lb large post	12 1/2lb demy	45gsm	11 3/4lb bond
30lb double large post 480	15 3/4lb large post	17 3/4lb demy	63gsm	16 3/4lb bond
30lb double large post 500	15lb large post	17lb demy	61gsm	16 1/4lb bond
30lb double large post 504	15lb large post	17lb demy	60gsm	16lb bond
36lb double large post 480	18 3/4lb large post	21 1/4lb demy	76gsm	20 1/4lb bond
36lb double large post 500	18lb large post	20 1/2lb demy	73gsm	19 1/2lb bond
36lb double large post 504	17 3/4lb large post	20 1/4lb demy	72gsm	19 1/4lb bond
42lb double large post 480	22lb large post	24 3/4lb demy	89gsm	23 1/2lb bond
42lb double large post 500	21lb large post	23 3/4lb demy	85gsm	22 3/4lb bond
42lb double large post 504	20 3/4lb large post	23 3/4lb demy	85gsm	22 1/2lb bond
44lb double large post 504	21 3/4lb large post	24 3/4lb demy	89gsm	23 1/2lb bond
13lb small medium 480	12 1/4lb large post	13 3/4lb demy	49gsm	13lb bond
18lb small medium 480	17lb large post	19 1/4lb demy	68gsm	18 1/4lb bond
21lb small medium 504	18 3/4lb large post	21 1/4lb demy	76gsm	20 1/4lb bond
21 1/2lb small medium 500	19 1/4lb large post	22lb demy	79gsm	21lb bond
23lb small medium 480	21 1/2lb large post	24 1/2lb demy	88gsm	23 1/4lb bond
23lb small medium 504	20 1/2lb large post	23 1/4lb demy	83gsm	22lb bond
24lb small medium 504	21 1/2lb large post	24 1/4lb demy	87gsm	23 1/4lb bond
25lb small medium 480	23 1/2lb large post	26 3/4lb demy	95gsm	25 1/4lb bond
25lb small medium 504	22 1/4lb large post	25 1/4lb demy	91gsm	24lb bond
30lb small medium 516	26 1/4lb large post	29 3/4lb demy	106gsm	28 1/4lb bond
34lb small medium 480	32lb large post	36 1/4lb demy	129gsm	34 1/2lb bond
40lb small medium 504	35 3/4lb large post	40 1/2lb demy	145gsm	38 1/2lb bond
13lb medium 500	11lb large post	12 1/4lb demy	44gsm	11 3/4lb bond
14lb medium 500	12 1/2lb large post	13 1/4lb demy	51gsm	13 1/2lb bond
18lb medium 480	15 3/4lb large post	17 3/4lb demy	64gsm	17lb bond
18lb medium 500	15lb large post	17lb demy	61gsm	16 1/4lb bond
21lb medium 500	17 1/2lb large post	20lb demy	71gsm	19lb bond
21 1/2lb medium 500	18lb large post	20 1/2lb demy	73gsm	19 1/2lb bond
25lb medium 500	21lb large post	23 3/4lb demy	85gsm	22 1/2lb bond
28lb medium 500	23 1/2lb large post	26 3/4lb demy	95gsm	25 1/4lb bond
26lb double medium 500	11lb large post	12 1/4lb demy	44gsm	11 3/4lb bond
36lb double medium 500	15lb large post	17lb demy	61gsm	16 1/4lb bond
46lb double medium 480	20lb large post	22 3/4lb demy	81gsm	21 3/4lb bond
46lb double medium 504	19lb large post	21 3/4lb demy	77gsm	20 1/2lb bond
48lb double medium 504	20lb large post	22 3/4lb demy	81gsm	21 1/2lb bond
50lb double medium 504	20 3/4lb large post	23 1/2lb demy	84gsm	22 1/2lb bond
60lb double medium 480	26 1/4lb large post	29 3/4lb demy	106gsm	28 1/4lb bond
60lb double medium 500	25lb large post	28 1/2lb demy	102gsm	27lb bond
70lb double medium 500	29 1/4lb large post	33 1/4lb demy	119gsm	31 1/2lb bond
20lb double small foolscap 500	15 3/4lb large post	18lb demy	64gsm	17lb bond
24lb double small foolscap 480	19 3/4lb large post	22 1/2lb demy	80gsm	21 1/2lb bond
24lb double small foolscap 500	19lb large post	21 1/2lb demy	77gsm	20 1/2lb bond
25lb double small foolscap 480	20 3/4lb large post	23 1/2lb demy	84gsm	22 1/4lb bond
26lb double small foolscap 504	20 1/2lb large post	23 1/4lb demy	83gsm	22lb bond
28lb double small foolscap 480	23lb large post	26 1/4lb demy	94gsm	25lb bond
28lb double small foolscap 500	22 1/4lb large post	25 1/2lb demy	90gsm	24lb bond
28lb double small foolscap 504	22lb large post	25lb demy	89gsm	23 3/4lb bond
30lb double small foolscap 480	24 3/4lb large post	28 1/4lb demy	100gsm	26 3/4lb bond
30lb double small foolscap 504	23 1/2lb large post	26 3/4lb demy	96gsm	25 1/2lb bond
32lb double small foolscap 504	25 1/4lb large post	28 1/2lb demy	102gsm	27 1/4lb bond
34lb double small foolscap 504	26 3/4lb large post	30 1/4lb demy	108gsm	28 3/4lb bond
36lb double small foolscap 480	29 3/4lb large post	33 3/4lb demy	121gsm	32lb bond
14 1/2lb double foolscap 480	11 1/2lb large post	13lb demy	46gsm	12 1/4lb bond
14 1/2lb double foolscap 500	11lb large post	12 1/2lb demy	44gsm	11 3/4lb bond
20lb double foolscap 480	15 3/4lb large post	17 3/4lb demy	64gsm	17lb bond
20lb double foolscap 500	15lb large post	17 1/4lb demy	61gsm	16 1/4lb bond
24lb double foolscap 480	19lb large post	21 1/2lb demy	77gsm	20 1/4lb bond
24lb double foolscap 500	18lb large post	20 1/2lb demy	74gsm	19 1/2lb bond
28lb double foolscap 500	21 1/4lb large post	24lb demy	86gsm	22 3/4lb bond
30lb double crown 500	17 1/4lb large post	19 3/4lb demy	70gsm	18 3/4lb bond
32lb double crown 480	19 1/4lb large post	22lb demy	78gsm	20 3/4lb bond
32lb double crown 504	18 1/4lb large post	20 3/4lb demy	74gsm	19 3/4lb bond
36lb double crown 500	20 3/4lb large post	23 3/4lb demy	84gsm	22 1/2lb bond
40lb double crown 500	23lb large post	26 1/4lb demy	94gsm	25lb bond
40lb double crown 504	23lb large post	26lb demy	93gsm	24 3/4lb bond
44lb double crown 500	25 1/2lb large post	29lb demy	103gsm	27 1/2lb bond
46lb double crown 480	27 3/4lb large post	31 1/2lb demy	112gsm	29 3/4lb bond
50lb double crown 500	28 3/4lb large post	32 3/4lb demy	117gsm	31 1/4lb bond
60lb double crown 504	34 1/2lb large post	39lb demy	139gsm	37lb bond
88lb quad crown 500	25 1/2lb large post	29lb demy	103gsm	27 1/2lb bond
100lb quad crown 500	28 3/4lb large post	32 3/4lb demy	117gsm	31 1/4lb bond
25lb small demy 480	29lb large post	33lb demy	118gsm	31 1/2lb bond
38lb small demy 480	44 1/4lb large post	50 1/4lb demy	180gsm	47 3/4lb bond
18lb small foolscap 480	29 3/4lb large post	33 3/4lb demy	121gsm	32lb bond
48lb quad foolscap 504	18lb large post	20 1/2lb demy	73gsm	19 1/2lb bond
50lb quad foolscap 480	19 3/4lb large post	22 1/4lb demy	80gsm	21 1/4lb bond
72lb imperial (writing and printing) 480	39 1/2lb large post	44 3/4lb demy	160gsm	42 1/2lb bond
18lb post (writing) (pre–‍1937 standardisation) 480	22 1/2lb large post	25 1/2lb demy	91gsm	24 1/4lb bond
20lb post (writing) (pre–‍1937 standardisation) 480	25lb large post	28 1/4lb demy	101gsm	27lb bond
22lb post (writing) (pre–‍1937 standardisation) 480	27 1/2lb large post	31 1/4lb demy	111gsm	29 1/2lb bond
72lb quad large post 504	17 3/4lb large post	20 1/4lb demy	72gsm	19 1/4lb bond
84lb quad large post 480	22lb large post	24 3/4lb demy	89gsm	23 1/2lb bond
29lb pinched post 480	38 1/4lb large post	43 1/2lb demy	156gsm	41 1/2lb bond
44lb small royal 480	34 3/4lb large post	39 1/2lb demy	141gsm	37 1/2lb bond
54lb super royal (writing) (pre–‍1925 standardisation) 480	37 1/2lb large post	42 1/2lb demy	152gsm	40 1/2lb bond
Printing paper
Common British basis weights (various paper sizes and ream sizes)	Equivalent weight of a 500‑sheet ream of double crown paper, a British uncut printing paper commonly used to express the basis weight of printing paper (rounded to the nearest quarter) (a common British basis for intra‑category comparison)	Equivalent weight of a 500‑sheet ream of demy paper, a British uncut printing paper commonly used by default to express the basis weight of different types of paper (rounded to the nearest quarter) (a common British basis for cross‑category comparison)	Equivalent grammage (rounded to the nearest one)	Equivalent weight of a 500‑sheet ream of bond paper, an American uncut paper commonly used to express the basis weight of paper (rounded to the nearest quarter) (a common American basis for cross‑category comparison)
17lb double crown 480	17 3/4lb double crown	11 1/2lb demy	42gsm	11lb bond
19lb double crown 480	19 3/4lb double crown	13lb demy	46gsm	12 1/4lb bond
20lb double crown 480	20 3/4lb double crown	13 3/4lb demy	49gsm	13lb bond
20lb double crown 516	19 1/2lb double crown	12 3/4lb demy	45gsm	12lb bond
21lb double crown 480	22lb double crown	14 1/4lb demy	51gsm	13 3/4lb bond
22lb double crown 480	23lb double crown	15lb demy	54gsm	14 1/4lb bond
23lb double crown 480	24lb double crown	15 3/4lb demy	56gsm	15lb bond
23lb double crown 504	22 3/4lb double crown	15lb demy	53gsm	14 1/4lb bond
24lb double crown 504	23 3/4lb double crown	15 3/4lb demy	56gsm	14 3/4lb bond
24lb double crown 516	23 1/4lb double crown	15 1/4lb demy	55gsm	14 1/2lb bond
25lb double crown 480	26lb double crown	17lb demy	61gsm	16 1/4lb bond
25lb double crown 504	24 3/4lb double crown	16 1/4lb demy	58gsm	15 1/2lb bond
26lb double crown 480	27lb double crown	17 3/4lb demy	63gsm	16 3/4lb bond
26lb double crown 504	25 3/4lb double crown	17lb demy	60gsm	16lb bond
26lb double crown 516	25 1/4lb double crown	16 1/2lb demy	59gsm	15 3/4lb bond
27lb double crown 480	28 1/2lb double crown	18 1/2lb demy	66gsm	17 1/2lb bond
27lb double crown 500	27lb double crown	17 3/4lb demy	63gsm	16 3/4lb bond
27lb double crown 504	26 3/4lb double crown	17 1/2lb demy	63gsm	16 3/4lb bond
28lb double crown 480	29 1/4lb double crown	19 1/4lb demy	68gsm	18 1/4lb bond
28lb double crown 516	27 1/4lb double crown	17 3/4lb demy	64gsm	17lb bond
29lb double crown 480	30 1/4lb double crown	19 3/4lb demy	71gsm	18 3/4lb bond
30lb double crown 480	31 1/4lb double crown	20 1/2lb demy	73gsm	19 1/2lb bond
30lb double crown 500	30lb double crown	19 3/4lb demy	70gsm	18 3/4lb bond
30lb double crown 504	29 3/4lb double crown	19 1/2lb demy	70gsm	18 1/2lb bond
30lb double crown 516	29lb double crown	19lb demy	68gsm	18lb bond
31lb double crown 504	30 3/4lb double crown	20 1/4lb demy	72gsm	19 1/4lb bond
32lb double crown 480	33 1/4lb double crown	22lb demy	78gsm	20 3/4lb bond
32lb double crown 504	31 3/4lb double crown	20 3/4lb demy	74gsm	19 3/4lb bond
32lb double crown 516	31lb double crown	20 1/4lb demy	73gsm	19 1/4lb bond
33lb double crown 480	35lb double crown	22 1/2lb demy	81gsm	21 1/2lb bond
33lb double crown 504	32 3/4lb double crown	21 1/2lb demy	77gsm	20 1/2lb bond
34lb double crown 504	33 3/4lb double crown	22 1/4lb demy	79gsm	21lb bond
34lb double crown 516	33lb double crown	21 1/2lb demy	77gsm	20 1/2lb bond
35lb double crown 480	36 1/2lb double crown	24lb demy	85gsm	22 3/4lb bond
36lb double crown 480	37 1/2lb double crown	24 1/2lb demy	88gsm	23 1/2lb bond
36lb double crown 500	36lb double crown	23 3/4lb demy	84gsm	22 1/2lb bond
36lb double crown 504	35 3/4lb double crown	23 1/2lb demy	84gsm	22 1/4lb bond
36lb double crown 516	35lb double crown	23lb demy	82gsm	21 3/4lb bond
38lb double crown 480	39 1/2lb double crown	26lb demy	93gsm	24 3/4lb bond
38lb double crown 504	37 3/4lb double crown	24 3/4lb demy	88gsm	23 1/2lb bond
38lb double crown 516	36 3/4lb double crown	24 1/4lb demy	86gsm	23lb bond
39lb double crown 504	38 3/4lb double crown	25 1/2lb demy	91gsm	24lb bond
40lb double crown 480	41 3/4lb double crown	27 1/4lb demy	98gsm	26lb bond
40lb double crown 500	40lb double crown	26 1/4lb demy	94gsm	25lb bond
40lb double crown 504	39 3/4lb double crown	26lb demy	93gsm	24 3/4lb bond
40lb double crown 516	38 3/4lb double crown	25 1/2lb demy	91gsm	24 1/4lb bond
42lb double crown 480	43 3/4lb double crown	28 3/4lb demy	103gsm	27 1/4lb bond
42lb double crown 504	41 3/4lb double crown	27 1/4lb demy	98gsm	26lb bond
44lb double crown 480	45 3/4lb double crown	30lb demy	107gsm	28 1/2lb bond
44lb double crown 500	44lb double crown	28 3/4lb demy	103gsm	27 1/2lb bond
44lb double crown 516	42 3/4lb double crown	28lb demy	100gsm	26 1/2lb bond
45lb double crown 480	47lb double crown	30 3/4lb demy	110gsm	29 1/4lb bond
45lb double crown 500	45lb double crown	29 1/2lb demy	105gsm	28lb bond
46lb double crown 480	48lb double crown	31 1/2lb demy	112gsm	29 3/4lb bond
46lb double crown 504	45 3/4lb double crown	30lb demy	107gsm	28 1/2lb bond
46lb double crown 516	44 1/2lb double crown	29 1/4lb demy	104gsm	27 3/4lb bond
47lb double crown 480	49lb double crown	32lb demy	115gsm	30 1/2lb bond
50lb double crown 480	52lb double crown	34 1/4lb demy	122gsm	32 1/2lb bond
50lb double crown 500	50lb double crown	32 3/4lb demy	117gsm	31 1/4lb bond
50lb double crown 504	49 1/2lb double crown	32 1/2lb demy	116gsm	31lb bond
50lb double crown 516	48 1/2lb double crown	31 3/4lb demy	114gsm	30 1/4lb bond
52lb double crown 480	54 1/4lb double crown	35 1/2lb demy	127gsm	33 3/4lb bond
54lb double crown 480	56 1/4lb double crown	37lb demy	132gsm	35lb bond
54lb double crown 516	52 1/4lb double crown	34 1/4lb demy	123gsm	32 1/2lb bond
55lb double crown 480	57 1/4lb double crown	37 1/2lb demy	134gsm	35 3/4lb bond
56lb double crown 516	54 1/4lb double crown	35 1/2lb demy	127gsm	33 3/4lb bond
57lb double crown 480	59 1/2lb double crown	39lb demy	139gsm	37lb bond
58lb double crown 500	58lb double crown	38lb demy	136gsm	36 1/4lb bond
60lb double crown 480	62 1/2lb double crown	41lb demy	146gsm	39lb bond
60lb double crown 500	60lb double crown	39 1/2lb demy	141gsm	37 1/2lb bond
60lb double crown 504	59 1/2lb double crown	39lb demy	139gsm	37lb bond
60lb double crown 516	58 1/4lb double crown	38 1/4lb demy	136gsm	36 1/4lb bond
61lb double crown 480	63 1/2lb double crown	41 3/4lb demy	149gsm	39 1/2lb bond
76lb double crown 480	79 1/4lb double crown	52lb demy	186gsm	49 1/4lb bond
79lb double crown 516	76 1/2lb double crown	50 1/4lb demy	179gsm	47 3/4lb bond
80lb double crown 480	83 1/4lb double crown	54 3/4lb demy	195gsm	52lb bond
80lb double crown 504	79 1/4lb double crown	52lb demy	186gsm	49 1/2lb bond
40lb quad crown 516	19 1/2lb double crown	12 3/4lb demy	45gsm	12lb bond
48lb quad crown 504	23 3/4lb double crown	15 3/4lb demy	56gsm	14 3/4lb bond
50lb quad crown 480	26lb double crown	17lb demy	61gsm	16 1/4lb bond
54lb quad crown 500	27lb double crown	17 3/4lb demy	63gsm	16 3/4lb bond
60lb quad crown 480	31 1/4lb double crown	20 1/2lb demy	73gsm	19 1/2lb bond
60lb quad crown 500	30lb double crown	19 3/4lb demy	70gsm	18 3/4lb bond
60lb quad crown 504	29 3/4lb double crown	19 1/2lb demy	70gsm	18 1/2lb bond
60lb quad crown 516	29lb double crown	19lb demy	68gsm	18lb bond
64lb quad crown 516	31lb double crown	20 1/4lb demy	73gsm	19 1/4lb bond
68lb quad crown 516	33lb double crown	21 1/2lb demy	77gsm	20 1/2lb bond
70lb quad crown 480	36 1/2lb double crown	24lb demy	85gsm	22 3/4lb bond
70lb quad crown 516	34lb double crown	22 1/4lb demy	79gsm	21 1/4lb bond
72lb quad crown 500	36lb double crown	23 3/4lb demy	84gsm	22 1/2lb bond
72lb quad crown 504	35 3/4lb double crown	23 1/2lb demy	84gsm	22 1/4lb bond
80lb quad crown 500	40lb double crown	26 1/4lb demy	94gsm	25lb bond
80lb quad crown 504	39 3/4lb double crown	26lb demy	93gsm	24 3/4lb bond
80lb quad crown 516	38 3/4lb double crown	25 1/2lb demy	91gsm	24 1/4lb bond
86lb quad crown 480	44 3/4lb double crown	29 1/2lb demy	105gsm	28lb bond
88lb quad crown 500	44lb double crown	29lb demy	103gsm	27 1/2lb bond
96lb quad crown 516	46 1/2lb double crown	30 1/2lb demy	109gsm	29lb bond
100lb quad crown 500	50lb double crown	32 3/4lb demy	117gsm	31 1/4lb bond
100lb quad crown 504	49 1/2lb double crown	32 1/2lb demy	116gsm	31lb bond
100lb quad crown 516	48 1/2lb double crown	31 3/4lb demy	114gsm	30 1/4lb bond
120lb quad crown 500	60lb double crown	39 1/2lb demy	141gsm	37 1/2lb bond
120lb quad crown 504	59 1/2lb double crown	39lb demy	139gsm	37lb bond
120lb quad crown 516	58 1/4lb double crown	38 1/4lb demy	136gsm	36 1/4lb bond
14lb demy 480	22 1/4lb double crown	14 1/2lb demy	52gsm	13 3/4lb bond
16lb demy 480	25 1/2lb double crown	16 3/4lb demy	60gsm	15 3/4lb bond
17lb demy 480	27lb double crown	17 3/4lb demy	63gsm	16 3/4lb bond
18lb demy 480	28 1/2lb double crown	18 3/4lb demy	67gsm	17 3/4lb bond
18lb demy 504	27 1/4lb double crown	17 3/4lb demy	64gsm	17lb bond
19lb demy 480	30 1/4lb double crown	19 3/4lb demy	71gsm	18 3/4lb bond
20lb demy 480	31 3/4lb double crown	20 3/4lb demy	74gsm	19 3/4lb bond
20lb demy 504	30 1/4lb double crown	19 3/4lb demy	71gsm	18 3/4lb bond
20lb demy 516	29 1/2lb double crown	19 1/2lb demy	69gsm	18 1/2lb bond
21lb demy 480	33 1/4lb double crown	22lb demy	78gsm	20 3/4lb bond
24lb demy 504	36 1/4lb double crown	23 3/4lb demy	85gsm	22 1/2lb bond
25lb demy 480	39 3/4lb double crown	26lb demy	93gsm	24 3/4lb bond
26lb demy 480	41 1/4lb double crown	27lb demy	97gsm	25 3/4lb bond
28lb demy 480	44 1/2lb double crown	29 1/4lb demy	104gsm	27 3/4lb bond
29lb demy 480	46lb double crown	30 1/4lb demy	108gsm	28 3/4lb bond
30lb demy 480	47 1/2lb double crown	31 1/4lb demy	112gsm	29 3/4lb bond
30lb demy 516	44 1/4lb double crown	29lb demy	104gsm	27 1/2lb bond
32lb demy 480	50 3/4lb double crown	33 1/4lb demy	119gsm	31 3/4lb bond
34lb demy 480	54lb double crown	35 1/2lb demy	126gsm	33 3/4lb bond
35lb demy 480	55 1/2lb double crown	36 1/2lb demy	130gsm	34 1/2lb bond
36lb demy 480	57 1/4lb double crown	37 1/2lb demy	134gsm	35 1/2lb bond
44lb demy 480	69 3/4lb double crown	45 3/4lb demy	164gsm	43 1/2lb bond
64lb demy 516	94 1/2lb double crown	62lb demy	221gsm	59lb bond
23lb double demy 480	18 1/4lb double crown	12lb demy	43gsm	11 1/2lb bond
25lb double demy 480	19 3/4lb double crown	13lb demy	46gsm	12 1/4lb bond
26lb double demy 480	20 3/4lb double crown	13 1/2lb demy	48gsm	12 3/4lb bond
28lb double demy 480	22 1/4lb double crown	14 1/2lb demy	52gsm	13 3/4lb bond
28lb double demy 516	20 3/4lb double crown	13 1/2lb demy	48gsm	13lb bond
30lb double demy 480	23 3/4lb double crown	15 3/4lb demy	56gsm	14 3/4lb bond
30lb double demy 516	22 1/4lb double crown	14 1/2lb demy	52gsm	13 3/4lb bond
32lb double demy 480	25 1/2lb double crown	16 3/4lb demy	60gsm	15 3/4lb bond
32lb double demy 504	24 1/4lb double crown	15 3/4lb demy	57gsm	15lb bond
32lb double demy 516	23 1/2lb double crown	15 1/2lb demy	55gsm	14 3/4lb bond
33lb double demy 480	26 1/4lb double crown	17 1/4lb demy	61gsm	16 1/4lb bond
34lb double demy 480	27lb double crown	17 3/4lb demy	63gsm	16 3/4lb bond
34lb double demy 504	25 3/4lb double crown	16 3/4lb demy	60gsm	16lb bond
34lb double demy 516	25lb double crown	16 1/2lb demy	59gsm	15 3/4lb bond
35lb double demy 480	27 3/4lb double crown	18 1/4lb demy	65gsm	17 1/4lb bond
36lb double demy 480	28 1/2lb double crown	18 3/4lb demy	67gsm	17 3/4lb bond
36lb double demy 500	27 1/2lb double crown	18lb demy	64gsm	17lb bond
36lb double demy 504	27 1/4lb double crown	17 3/4lb demy	64gsm	17lb bond
36lb double demy 516	26 1/2lb double crown	17 1/2lb demy	62gsm	16 1/2lb bond
38lb double demy 480	30 1/4lb double crown	19 3/4lb demy	71gsm	18 3/4lb bond
38lb double demy 504	28 3/4lb double crown	18 3/4lb demy	67gsm	18lb bond
40lb double demy 480	31 3/4lb double crown	20 3/4lb demy	74gsm	19 3/4lb bond
40lb double demy 500	30 1/2lb double crown	20lb demy	71gsm	19lb bond
40lb double demy 504	30 1/4lb double crown	19 3/4lb demy	71gsm	18 3/4lb bond
40lb double demy 516	29 1/2lb double crown	19 1/2lb demy	69gsm	18 1/2lb bond
42lb double demy 480	33 1/4lb double crown	22lb demy	78gsm	20 3/4lb bond
42lb double demy 516	31lb double crown	20 1/4lb demy	73gsm	19 1/4lb bond
44lb double demy 516	32 1/2lb double crown	21 1/4lb demy	76gsm	20 1/4lb bond
45lb double demy 500	34 1/4lb double crown	22 1/2lb demy	80gsm	21 1/4lb bond
45lb double demy 516	33 1/4lb double crown	21 3/4lb demy	78gsm	20 3/4lb bond
46lb double demy 480	36 1/2lb double crown	24lb demy	86gsm	22 3/4lb bond
46lb double demy 516	34lb double crown	22 1/4lb demy	80gsm	21 1/4lb bond
47lb double demy 516	34 3/4lb double crown	22 3/4lb demy	81gsm	21 1/2lb bond
48lb double demy 480	38lb double crown	25lb demy	89gsm	23 3/4lb bond
48lb double demy 500	36 1/2lb double crown	24lb demy	86gsm	22 3/4lb bond
48lb double demy 504	36 1/4lb double crown	23 3/4lb demy	85gsm	22 1/2lb bond
48lb double demy 516	35 1/2lb double crown	23 1/4lb demy	83gsm	22lb bond
50lb double demy 480	39 3/4lb double crown	26lb demy	93gsm	24 3/4lb bond
52lb double demy 504	39 1/4lb double crown	25 3/4lb demy	92gsm	24 1/2lb bond
53lb double demy 516	39 1/4lb double crown	25 3/4lb demy	92gsm	24 1/2lb bond
54lb double demy 480	42 3/4lb double crown	28 1/4lb demy	100gsm	26 3/4lb bond
55lb double demy 480	43 3/4lb double crown	28 3/4lb demy	102gsm	27 1/4lb bond
55lb double demy 516	40 1/2lb double crown	26 3/4lb demy	95gsm	25 1/4lb bond
56lb double demy 480	44 1/2lb double crown	29 1/4lb demy	104gsm	27 3/4lb bond
56lb double demy 516	41 1/4lb double crown	27 1/4lb demy	97gsm	25 3/4lb bond
60lb double demy 480	47 1/2lb double crown	31 1/4lb demy	112gsm	29 3/4lb bond
60lb double demy 504	45 1/4lb double crown	29 3/4lb demy	106gsm	28 1/4lb bond
60lb double demy 516	44 1/4lb double crown	29lb demy	104gsm	27 1/2lb bond
64lb double demy 516	47 1/4lb double crown	31lb demy	111gsm	29 1/2lb bond
68lb double demy 480	54lb double crown	35 1/2lb demy	126gsm	33 3/4lb bond
69lb double demy 480	54 3/4lb double crown	36lb demy	128gsm	34 1/4lb bond
70lb double demy 480	55 1/2lb double crown	36 1/2lb demy	130gsm	34 1/2lb bond
72lb double demy 516	53 1/4lb double crown	35lb demy	125gsm	33 1/4lb bond
74lb double demy 480	58 3/4lb double crown	38 1/2lb demy	138gsm	36 1/2lb bond
80lb double demy 504	60 1/2lb double crown	39 3/4lb demy	142gsm	37 3/4lb bond
88lb double demy 516	65lb double crown	42 3/4lb demy	152gsm	40 1/2lb bond
89lb double demy 480	70 3/4lb double crown	46 1/4lb demy	166gsm	44lb bond
19lb medium 480	28 3/4lb double crown	18 3/4lb demy	67gsm	18lb bond
20lb medium 480	30 1/4lb double crown	19 3/4lb demy	71gsm	18 3/4lb bond
24lb medium 480	36 1/4lb double crown	23 3/4lb demy	85gsm	22 1/2lb bond
25lb medium 480	37 3/4lb double crown	24 3/4lb demy	88gsm	23 1/2lb bond
25lb medium 504	36lb double crown	23 1/2lb demy	84gsm	22 1/2lb bond
27lb medium 480	40 3/4lb double crown	26 3/4lb demy	96gsm	25 1/2lb bond
28lb medium 480	42 1/4lb double crown	27 3/4lb demy	99gsm	26 1/4lb bond
29lb medium 480	43 3/4lb double crown	28 3/4lb demy	103gsm	27 1/4lb bond
30lb medium 480	45 1/4lb double crown	29 3/4lb demy	106gsm	28 1/4lb bond
30lb medium 516	42 1/4lb double crown	27 3/4lb demy	99gsm	26 1/4lb bond
31lb medium 480	46 3/4lb double crown	30 3/4lb demy	110gsm	29 1/4lb bond
32lb medium 480	48 1/4lb double crown	31 3/4lb demy	113gsm	30lb bond
33lb medium 516	46 1/4lb double crown	30 1/2lb demy	109gsm	29lb bond
34lb medium 480	51 1/4lb double crown	33 3/4lb demy	120gsm	32lb bond
34lb medium 504	49lb double crown	32lb demy	115gsm	30 1/2lb bond
35lb medium 480	52 3/4lb double crown	34 3/4lb demy	124gsm	33lb bond
38lb medium 516	53 1/4lb double crown	35lb demy	125gsm	33 1/4lb bond
40lb medium 480	60 1/2lb double crown	39 3/4lb demy	142gsm	37 3/4lb bond
40lb medium 504	57 1/2lb double crown	37 3/4lb demy	135gsm	35 3/4lb bond
40lb medium 516	56 1/4lb double crown	36 3/4lb demy	132gsm	35lb bond
45lb medium 480	68lb double crown	44 1/2lb demy	159gsm	42 1/4lb bond
48lb medium 480	72 1/2lb double crown	47 1/2lb demy	170gsm	45 1/4lb bond
50lb medium 504	72lb double crown	47 1/4lb demy	168gsm	44 3/4lb bond
53lb medium 504	76 1/4lb double crown	50lb demy	179gsm	47 1/2lb bond
55lb medium 480	83lb double crown	54 1/2lb demy	195gsm	51 3/4lb bond
42lb double medium 480	31 3/4lb double crown	20 3/4lb demy	74gsm	19 3/4lb bond
50lb double medium 480	37 3/4lb double crown	24 3/4lb demy	88gsm	23 1/2lb bond
50lb double medium 504	36lb double crown	23 1/2lb demy	84gsm	22 1/2lb bond
50lb double medium 516	35lb double crown	23lb demy	82gsm	22lb bond
55lb double medium 500	39 3/4lb double crown	26 1/4lb demy	93gsm	24 3/4lb bond
60lb double medium 500	43 1/2lb double crown	28 1/2lb demy	102gsm	27lb bond
60lb double medium 516	42 1/4lb double crown	27 3/4lb demy	99gsm	26 1/4lb bond
62lb double medium 500	45lb double crown	29 1/2lb demy	105gsm	28lb bond
64lb double medium 516	45lb double crown	29 1/2lb demy	105gsm	28lb bond
65lb double medium 500	47lb double crown	31lb demy	110gsm	29 1/4lb bond
68lb double medium 480	51 1/4lb double crown	33 3/4lb demy	120gsm	32lb bond
68lb double medium 504	49lb double crown	32lb demy	115gsm	30 1/2lb bond
69lb double medium 500	50lb double crown	32 3/4lb demy	117gsm	31 1/4lb bond
70lb double medium 500	50 3/4lb double crown	33 1/4lb demy	119gsm	31 1/2lb bond
80lb double medium 500	58lb double crown	38lb demy	136gsm	36 1/4lb bond
80lb double medium 516	56 1/4lb double crown	36 3/4lb demy	132gsm	35lb bond
20lb royal 480	25lb double crown	16 1/2lb demy	59gsm	15 1/2lb bond
21lb royal 516	24 1/2lb double crown	16lb demy	57gsm	15 1/4lb bond
22lb royal 480	27 1/2lb double crown	18lb demy	64gsm	17 1/4lb bond
23lb royal 480	28 3/4lb double crown	18 3/4lb demy	67gsm	18lb bond
24lb royal 480	30lb double crown	19 3/4lb demy	70gsm	18 3/4lb bond
24lb royal 504	28 1/2lb double crown	18 3/4lb demy	67gsm	17 3/4lb bond
24lb royal 516	28lb double crown	18 1/4lb demy	65gsm	17 1/2lb bond
25lb royal 516	29lb double crown	19lb demy	68gsm	18lb bond
26lb royal 480	32 1/2lb double crown	21 1/4lb demy	76gsm	20 1/4lb bond
26lb royal 516	30 1/4lb double crown	19 3/4lb demy	71gsm	18 3/4lb bond
27lb royal 516	31 1/2lb double crown	20 1/2lb demy	74gsm	19 1/2lb bond
30lb royal 480	37 1/2lb double crown	24 1/2lb demy	88gsm	23 1/4lb bond
30lb royal 516	35lb double crown	23lb demy	82gsm	21 3/4lb bond
31lb royal 480	38 3/4lb double crown	25 1/2lb demy	91gsm	24 1/4lb bond
32lb royal 480	40lb double crown	26 1/4lb demy	94gsm	25lb bond
33lb royal 480	41 1/4lb double crown	27lb demy	97gsm	25 3/4lb bond
34lb royal 480	42 1/2lb double crown	28lb demy	100gsm	26 1/2lb bond
36lb royal 480	45lb double crown	29 1/2lb demy	105gsm	28lb bond
36lb royal 516	41 3/4lb double crown	27 1/2lb demy	98gsm	26lb bond
37lb royal 480	46 1/4lb double crown	30 1/4lb demy	108gsm	28 3/4lb bond
38lb royal 480	47 1/2lb double crown	31 1/4lb demy	111gsm	29 1/2lb bond
39lb royal 480	48 3/4lb double crown	32lb demy	114gsm	30 1/2lb bond
40lb royal 480	50lb double crown	32 3/4lb demy	117gsm	31 1/4lb bond
40lb royal 504	47 1/2lb double crown	31 1/4lb demy	112gsm	29 3/4lb bond
40lb royal 516	46 1/2lb double crown	30 1/2lb demy	109gsm	29lb bond
41lb royal 480	51 1/4lb double crown	33 3/4lb demy	120gsm	32lb bond
42lb royal 480	52 1/2lb double crown	34 1/2lb demy	123gsm	32 3/4lb bond
44lb royal 480	55lb double crown	36lb demy	129gsm	34 1/4lb bond
45lb royal 480	56 1/4lb double crown	37lb demy	132gsm	35lb bond
47lb royal 480	58 3/4lb double crown	38 1/2lb demy	138gsm	36 1/2lb bond
50lb royal 480	62 1/2lb double crown	41lb demy	146gsm	39lb bond
50lb royal 504	59 1/2lb double crown	39lb demy	139gsm	37lb bond
50lb royal 516	58 1/4lb double crown	38 1/4lb demy	136gsm	36 1/4lb bond
51lb royal 480	63 3/4lb double crown	41 3/4lb demy	149gsm	39 3/4lb bond
60lb royal 480	75lb double crown	49 1/4lb demy	176gsm	46 3/4lb bond
61lb royal 480	76 1/4lb double crown	50lb demy	179gsm	47 1/2lb bond
66lb royal 480	82 1/2lb double crown	54 1/4lb demy	193gsm	51 1/2lb bond
67lb royal 504	79 3/4lb double crown	52 1/4lb demy	187gsm	49 3/4lb bond
70lb royal 480	87 1/2lb double crown	57 1/2lb demy	205gsm	54 1/2lb bond
32lb double royal 500	19 1/4lb double crown	12 1/2lb demy	45gsm	12lb bond
37lb double royal 480	23 1/4lb double crown	15 1/4lb demy	54gsm	14 1/2lb bond
40lb double royal 504	23 3/4lb double crown	15 3/4lb demy	56gsm	14 3/4lb bond
42lb double royal 516	24 1/2lb double crown	16lb demy	57gsm	15 1/4lb bond
46lb double royal 480	28 3/4lb double crown	18 3/4lb demy	67gsm	18lb bond
48lb double royal 504	28 1/2lb double crown	18 3/4lb demy	67gsm	17 3/4lb bond
48lb double royal 516	28lb double crown	18 1/4lb demy	65gsm	17 1/2lb bond
50lb double royal 500	30lb double crown	19 3/4lb demy	70gsm	18 3/4lb bond
50lb double royal 516	29lb double crown	19lb demy	68gsm	18lb bond
54lb double royal 516	31 1/2lb double crown	20 1/2lb demy	74gsm	19 1/2lb bond
60lb double royal 500	36lb double crown	23 3/4lb demy	84gsm	22 1/2lb bond
60lb double royal 504	35 3/4lb double crown	23 1/2lb demy	84gsm	22 1/4lb bond
60lb double royal 516	35lb double crown	23lb demy	82gsm	21 3/4lb bond
66 1/2lb double royal 500	40lb double crown	26 1/4lb demy	94gsm	24 3/4lb bond
72lb double royal 504	42 3/4lb double crown	28 1/4lb demy	100gsm	26 3/4lb bond
72lb double royal 516	41 3/4lb double crown	27 1/2lb demy	98gsm	26lb bond
75lb double royal 500	45lb double crown	29 1/2lb demy	105gsm	28lb bond
80lb double royal 504	47 1/2lb double crown	31 1/4lb demy	112gsm	29 3/4lb bond
80lb double royal 516	46 1/2lb double crown	30 1/2lb demy	109gsm	29lb bond
91lb double royal 516	53lb double crown	34 3/4lb demy	124gsm	33lb bond
100lb double royal 504	59 1/2lb double crown	39lb demy	139gsm	37lb bond
100lb double royal 516	58 1/4lb double crown	38 1/4lb demy	136gsm	36 1/4lb bond
160lb quad royal 504	47 1/2lb double crown	31 1/4lb demy	112gsm	29 3/4lb bond
16lb crown 480	33 1/4lb double crown	22lb demy	78gsm	20 3/4lb bond
20lb crown 480	41 3/4lb double crown	27 1/4lb demy	98gsm	26lb bond
27lb crown 480	56 1/4lb double crown	37lb demy	132gsm	35lb bond
16lb double foolscap 480	21 3/4lb double crown	14 1/4lb demy	51gsm	13 1/2lb bond
21lb double foolscap 480	28 1/2lb double crown	18 3/4lb demy	67gsm	17 3/4lb bond
22lb double foolscap 480	30lb double crown	19 3/4lb demy	70gsm	18 3/4lb bond
23lb double foolscap 516	29 1/4lb double crown	19lb demy	68gsm	18 1/4lb bond
24lb double foolscap 480	32 3/4lb double crown	21 1/2lb demy	77gsm	20 1/4lb bond
25lb double foolscap 516	31 3/4lb double crown	20 3/4lb demy	74gsm	19 3/4lb bond
26lb double foolscap 480	35 1/2lb double crown	23 1/4lb demy	83gsm	22lb bond
28lb double foolscap 480	38 1/4lb double crown	25lb demy	89gsm	23 3/4lb bond
28lb double foolscap 516	35 1/2lb double crown	23 1/4lb demy	83gsm	22lb bond
29lb double foolscap 480	39 1/2lb double crown	26lb demy	93gsm	24 1/2lb bond
30lb double foolscap 480	40 3/4lb double crown	26 3/4lb demy	96gsm	25 1/2lb bond
30lb double foolscap 516	38lb double crown	25lb demy	89gsm	23 3/4lb bond
32lb double foolscap 480	43 1/2lb double crown	28 1/2lb demy	102gsm	27 1/4lb bond
36lb double foolscap 480	49lb double crown	32 1/4lb demy	115gsm	30 1/2lb bond
36lb double foolscap 516	45 1/2lb double crown	30lb demy	107gsm	28 1/2lb bond
38lb double foolscap 480	51 3/4lb double crown	34lb demy	121gsm	32 1/4lb bond
40lb double foolscap 480	54 1/2lb double crown	35 3/4lb demy	128gsm	34lb bond
45lb double foolscap 480	61 1/4lb double crown	40 1/4lb demy	144gsm	38 1/4lb bond
54lb double foolscap 480	73 1/2lb double crown	48 1/4lb demy	172gsm	45 3/4lb bond
67lb double foolscap 480	91 1/4lb double crown	59 3/4lb demy	214gsm	56 3/4lb bond
46lb quad foolscap 516	29 1/4lb double crown	19lb demy	68gsm	18 1/4lb bond
48lb quad foolscap 504	31lb double crown	20 1/2lb demy	73gsm	19 1/2lb bond
49lb quad foolscap 516	31lb double crown	20 1/4lb demy	73gsm	19 1/4lb bond
50lb quad foolscap 516	31 3/4lb double crown	20 3/4lb demy	74gsm	19 3/4lb bond
56lb quad foolscap 504	36 1/4lb double crown	23 3/4lb demy	85gsm	22 3/4lb bond
56lb quad foolscap 516	35 1/2lb double crown	23 1/4lb demy	83gsm	22lb bond
60lb quad foolscap 504	39lb double crown	25 1/2lb demy	91gsm	24 1/4lb bond
60lb quad foolscap 516	38lb double crown	25lb demy	89gsm	23 3/4lb bond
68lb quad foolscap 480	46 1/4lb double crown	30 1/2lb demy	108gsm	28 3/4lb bond
64lb quad demy 516	23 1/2lb double crown	15 1/2lb demy	55gsm	14 3/4lb bond
80lb quad demy 516	29 1/2lb double crown	19 1/2lb demy	69gsm	18 1/2lb bond
84lb quad demy 516	31lb double crown	20 1/4lb demy	73gsm	19 1/4lb bond
96lb quad demy 504	36 1/4lb double crown	23 3/4lb demy	85gsm	22 1/2lb bond
120lb quad demy 504	45 1/4lb double crown	29 3/4lb demy	106gsm	28 1/4lb bond
120lb quad demy 516	44 1/4lb double crown	29lb demy	104gsm	27 1/2lb bond
30lb imperial (writing and printing) 516	26 1/2lb double crown	17 1/4lb demy	62gsm	16 1/2lb bond
36lb imperial (writing and printing) 516	31 3/4lb double crown	20 3/4lb demy	74gsm	19 3/4lb bond
40lb imperial (writing and printing) 516	35 1/4lb double crown	23lb demy	83gsm	22lb bond
46lb imperial (writing and printing) 480	43 1/2lb double crown	28 1/2lb demy	102gsm	27 1/4lb bond
50lb imperial (writing and printing) 516	44lb double crown	29lb demy	103gsm	27 1/2lb bond
56lb imperial (writing and printing) 480	53lb double crown	34 3/4lb demy	124gsm	33lb bond
60lb imperial (writing and printing) 516	52 3/4lb double crown	34 3/4lb demy	124gsm	33lb bond
70lb imperial (writing and printing) 480	66 1/4lb double crown	43 1/2lb demy	155gsm	41 1/4lb bond
120lb imperial (writing and printing) 516	105 3/4lb double crown	69 1/4lb demy	248gsm	65 3/4lb bond
13lb post (printing) (pre–1937 standardisation) 480	27 1/4lb double crown	18lb demy	64gsm	17lb bond
14lb post (printing) (pre–1937 standardisation) 480	29 1/4lb double crown	19 1/4lb demy	69gsm	18 1/4lb bond
22lb post (printing) (pre–1937 standardisation) 480	46lb double crown	30 1/4lb demy	108gsm	28 3/4lb bond
23lb post (printing) (pre–1937 standardisation) 480	48 1/4lb double crown	31 1/2lb demy	113gsm	30lb bond
24lb post (printing) (pre–1937 standardisation) 480	50 1/4lb double crown	33lb demy	118gsm	31 1/4lb bond
16lb large post 480	28 3/4lb double crown	19lb demy	68gsm	18lb bond
17lb large post 480	30 3/4lb double crown	20lb demy	72gsm	19lb bond
18lb large post 480	32 1/2lb double crown	21 1/4lb demy	76gsm	20 1/4lb bond
18lb large post 500	31 1/4lb double crown	20 1/2lb demy	73gsm	19 1/2lb bond
21lb large post 480	38lb double crown	24 3/4lb demy	89gsm	23 1/2lb bond
21lb large post 500	36 1/4lb double crown	23 3/4lb demy	85gsm	22 3/4lb bond
21lb large post 504	36lb double crown	23 3/4lb demy	85gsm	22 1/2lb bond
24lb large post 480	43 1/4lb double crown	28 1/2lb demy	101gsm	27lb bond
25lb large post 480	45lb double crown	29 1/2lb demy	106gsm	28lb bond
26lb large post 480	47lb double crown	30 3/4lb demy	110gsm	29 1/4lb bond
27lb large post 480	48 3/4lb double crown	32lb demy	114gsm	30 1/4lb bond
28lb large post 480	50 1/2lb double crown	33lb demy	118gsm	31 1/2lb bond
29lb large post 480	52 1/4lb double crown	34 1/4lb demy	123gsm	32 1/2lb bond
30lb large post 480	54lb double crown	35 1/2lb demy	127gsm	33 3/4lb bond
30lb large post 504	51 1/2lb double crown	33 3/4lb demy	121gsm	32lb bond
31lb large post 480	56lb double crown	36 3/4lb demy	131gsm	34 3/4lb bond
32lb large post 480	57 3/4lb double crown	38lb demy	135gsm	36lb bond
34lb large post 480	61 1/4lb double crown	40 1/4lb demy	144gsm	38 1/4lb bond
36lb large post 480	65lb double crown	42 1/2lb demy	152gsm	40 1/2lb bond
44lb large post 480	79 1/4lb double crown	52lb demy	186gsm	49 1/2lb bond
36lb double large post 516	30 1/4lb double crown	19 3/4lb demy	71gsm	18 3/4lb bond
60lb double large post 480	54lb double crown	35 1/2lb demy	127gsm	33 3/4lb bond
60lb double large post 504	51 1/2lb double crown	33 3/4lb demy	121gsm	32lb bond
20lb 12 1/2 in by 19 in 480	52 1/2lb double crown	34 1/2lb demy	123gsm	32 3/4lb bond
25lb 15 in by 22 1/2 in 480	46 1/4lb double crown	30 1/4lb demy	108gsm	28 3/4lb bond
25lb 15 in by 23 in 480	45 1/4lb double crown	29 3/4lb demy	106gsm	28 1/4lb bond
20lb 15 1/2 in by 18 in 480	44 3/4lb double crown	29 1/2lb demy	105gsm	28lb bond
25lb 17 in by 23 in 480	40lb double crown	26 1/4lb demy	94gsm	25lb bond
30lb 17 in by 23 in 480	48lb double crown	31 1/2lb demy	112gsm	30lb bond
67lb 20 1/2 in by 25 1/2 in 500	77lb double crown	50 1/2lb demy	180gsm	48lb bond
84lb 20 1/2 in by 25 1/2 in 500	96 1/2lb double crown	63 1/4lb demy	226gsm	60lb bond
100lb 20 1/2 in by 25 1/2 in 500	114 3/4lb double crown	75 1/4lb demy	269gsm	71 1/2lb bond
118lb 20 1/2 in by 25 1/2 in 500	135 1/2lb double crown	88 3/4lb demy	317gsm	84 1/2lb bond
80lb 20 1/2 in by 30 1/2 in 500	76 3/4lb double crown	50 1/4lb demy	180gsm	47 3/4lb bond
100lb 20 1/2 in by 30 1/2 in 500	96lb double crown	63lb demy	225gsm	59 3/4lb bond
120lb 20 1/2 in by 30 1/2 in 500	115 1/4lb double crown	75 1/2lb demy	270gsm	71 3/4lb bond
140lb 20 1/2 in by 30 1/2 in 500	134 1/4lb double crown	88 1/4lb demy	315gsm	83 3/4lb bond
36lb 21 in by 29 in 516	34 1/4lb double crown	22 1/2lb demy	81gsm	21 1/2lb bond
75lb 21 in by 30 1/2 in 504	69 3/4lb double crown	45 3/4lb demy	163gsm	43 1/2lb bond
106lb 22 in by 25 in 500	115 3/4lb double crown	75 3/4lb demy	271gsm	72lb bond
124lb 22 in by 25 in 500	135 1/4lb double crown	88 3/4lb demy	317gsm	84 1/4lb bond
190lb 22 in by 25 in 500	207 1/4lb double crown	136lb demy	486gsm	129 1/4lb bond
122lb 22 in by 29 in 500	114 3/4lb double crown	75 1/4lb demy	269gsm	71 1/2lb bond
144lb 22 in by 29 in 500	135 1/2lb double crown	88 3/4lb demy	317gsm	84 1/2lb bond
220lb 22 in by 29 in 500	207lb double crown	135 3/4lb demy	485gsm	129lb bond
Wrapping paper
Common British basis weights (various paper sizes and ream sizes)	Equivalent weight of a 500‑sheet ream of double imperial paper, a British wrapping paper commonly used to express the basis weight of wrapping paper (rounded to the nearest quarter) (a common British basis for intra‑category comparison)	Equivalent weight of a 500‑sheet ream of demy paper, a British uncut printing paper commonly used by default to express the basis weight of different types of paper (rounded to the nearest quarter) (a common British basis for cross‑category comparison)	Equivalent grammage (rounded to the nearest one)	Equivalent weight of a 500‑sheet ream of bond paper, an American uncut paper commonly used to express the basis weight of paper (rounded to the nearest quarter) (a common American basis for cross‑category comparison)
28lb bag cap (pre–1937 standardisation) 480	81 1/4lb double imperial (wrapping)	24 1/2lb demy	88gsm	23 1/4lb bond
40lb bag cap (pre–1937 standardisation) 480	116 1/4lb double imperial (wrapping)	35lb demy	125gsm	33 1/4lb bond
50lb casing 480	41lb double imperial (wrapping)	12 1/2lb demy	44gsm	11 3/4lb bond
60lb casing 480	49 1/4lb double imperial (wrapping)	14 3/4lb demy	53gsm	14lb bond
70lb casing 480	57 1/2lb double imperial (wrapping)	17 1/4lb demy	62gsm	16 1/2lb bond
80lb casing 480	65 3/4lb double imperial (wrapping)	19 3/4lb demy	71gsm	18 3/4lb bond
100lb casing 480	82lb double imperial (wrapping)	24 3/4lb demy	88gsm	23 1/2lb bond
120lb casing 480	98 1/2lb double imperial (wrapping)	29 3/4lb demy	106gsm	28 1/4lb bond
140lb casing 480	115lb double imperial (wrapping)	34 3/4lb demy	124gsm	33lb bond
160lb casing 480	131 1/4lb double imperial (wrapping)	39 3/4lb demy	142gsm	37 3/4lb bond
13lb double crown 480	29 1/2lb double imperial (wrapping)	9lb demy	32gsm	8 1/2lb bond
15lb double crown 480	34lb double imperial (wrapping)	10 1/4lb demy	37gsm	9 3/4lb bond
19lb double crown 480	43lb double imperial (wrapping)	13lb demy	46gsm	12 1/4lb bond
23lb double crown 480	52lb double imperial (wrapping)	15 3/4lb demy	56gsm	15lb bond
24lb double crown 480	54 1/2lb double imperial (wrapping)	16 1/2lb demy	59gsm	15 1/2lb bond
47lb double crown 480	106 1/2lb double imperial (wrapping)	32lb demy	115gsm	30 1/2lb bond
80lb double crown 480	181 1/4lb double imperial (wrapping)	54 3/4lb demy	195gsm	52lb bond
100lb double crown 480	226 1/2lb double imperial (wrapping)	68 1/4lb demy	244gsm	65lb bond
120lb double crown 480	272lb double imperial (wrapping)	82lb demy	293gsm	78lb bond
34lb quad crown 480	38 1/2lb double imperial (wrapping)	11 1/2lb demy	42gsm	11lb bond
38lb quad crown 480	43lb double imperial (wrapping)	13lb demy	46gsm	12 1/4lb bond
48lb quad crown 504	51 3/4lb double imperial (wrapping)	15 1/2lb demy	56gsm	14 3/4lb bond
120lb quad crown 516	126 1/2lb double imperial (wrapping)	38 1/4lb demy	136gsm	36 1/4lb bond
15lb demy 480	51 3/4lb double imperial (wrapping)	15 3/4lb demy	56gsm	14 3/4lb bond
26lb double demy 480	45lb double imperial (wrapping)	13 1/2lb demy	48gsm	12 3/4lb bond
29lb double demy 516	46 1/2lb double imperial (wrapping)	14lb demy	50gsm	13 1/4lb bond
30lb double demy 480	51 3/4lb double imperial (wrapping)	15 3/4lb demy	56gsm	14 3/4lb bond
34lb double demy 480	58 3/4lb double imperial (wrapping)	17 3/4lb demy	63gsm	16 3/4lb bond
60lb double demy 480	103 1/2lb double imperial (wrapping)	31 1/4lb demy	112gsm	29 3/4lb bond
200lb extra large casing 480	141 1/2lb double imperial (wrapping)	42 3/4lb demy	153gsm	40 1/2lb bond
50lb imperial (wrapping) 480	104 1/4lb double imperial (wrapping)	31 1/2lb demy	112gsm	29 3/4lb bond
60lb imperial (wrapping) 480	125lb double imperial (wrapping)	37 3/4lb demy	135gsm	35 3/4lb bond
70lb imperial (wrapping) 480	145 3/4lb double imperial (wrapping)	44lb demy	157gsm	41 3/4lb bond
140lb imperial (wrapping) 480	291 3/4lb double imperial (wrapping)	88lb demy	314gsm	83 1/2lb bond
60lb double imperial (wrapping) 480	62 1/2lb double imperial (wrapping)	18 3/4lb demy	67gsm	18lb bond
65lb double imperial (wrapping) 480	67 3/4lb double imperial (wrapping)	20 1/2lb demy	73gsm	19 1/2lb bond
80lb double imperial (wrapping) 480	83 1/4lb double imperial (wrapping)	25 1/4lb demy	90gsm	24lb bond
100lb double imperial (wrapping) 480	104 1/4lb double imperial (wrapping)	31 1/2lb demy	112gsm	29 3/4lb bond
120lb double imperial (wrapping) 480	125lb double imperial (wrapping)	37 3/4lb demy	135gsm	35 3/4lb bond
140lb double imperial (wrapping) 480	145 3/4lb double imperial (wrapping)	44lb demy	157gsm	41 3/4lb bond
160lb double imperial (wrapping) 480	166 3/4lb double imperial (wrapping)	50 1/4lb demy	180gsm	47 3/4lb bond
240lb double imperial (wrapping) 480	250lb double imperial (wrapping)	75 1/2lb demy	269gsm	71 3/4lb bond
240lb double double imperial 480	125lb double imperial (wrapping)	37 3/4lb demy	135gsm	35 3/4lb bond
280lb double double imperial 480	145 3/4lb double imperial (wrapping)	44lb demy	157gsm	41 3/4lb bond
19lb small royal 480	56 3/4lb double imperial (wrapping)	17lb demy	61gsm	16 1/4lb bond
34lb quad small hand 480	38 1/2lb double imperial (wrapping)	11 1/2lb demy	42gsm	11lb bond
38lb quad small hand 480	43lb double imperial (wrapping)	13lb demy	46gsm	12 1/4lb bond
48lb quad small hand 504	51 3/4lb double imperial (wrapping)	15 1/2lb demy	56gsm	14 3/4lb bond
14lb 18 in by 26 in 480	40 3/4lb double imperial (wrapping)	12 1/4lb demy	44gsm	11 3/4lb bond
15lb 18 in by 26 in 480	43 1/2lb double imperial (wrapping)	13 1/4lb demy	47gsm	12 1/2lb bond
190lb 22 in by 25 in 500	450 3/4lb double imperial (wrapping)	136lb demy	486gsm	129 1/4lb bond
220lb 22 in by 29 in 500	450lb double imperial (wrapping)	135 3/4lb demy	485gsm	129lb bond
32lb 25 1/2 in by 35 in 480	48 3/4lb double imperial (wrapping)	14 3/4lb demy	53gsm	14lb bond
26lb 30 in by 38 in 480	31lb double imperial (wrapping)	9 1/4lb demy	33gsm	8 3/4lb bond
30lb 30 in by 38 in 480	35 3/4lb double imperial (wrapping)	10 3/4lb demy	39gsm	10 1/4lb bond
42lb 30 in by 38 in 480	50lb double imperial (wrapping)	15lb demy	54gsm	14 1/4lb bond
180lb 38 in by 48 in 480	134 1/4lb double imperial (wrapping)	40 1/2lb demy	145gsm	38 1/2lb bond

==== Conversion between British basis weights, American basis weights, and grammage ====
It is possible to convert between different basis weights – both British and American – and grammage using different conversion formulae.

To convert between the basis weights of different paper with the same basis‑ream size (e. g., from lb large post 500 to lb demy 500), the following formula can be employed:

Area of one sheet of paper in the target ream × Weight of the source ream ÷ Area of one sheet of paper in the source ream

To convert between the basis weights of different paper with different basis‑ream sizes (e. g., from lb large post 480 to lb demy 500), the relevant formula is below:

(Number of sheets of paper in the target ream × Area of one sheet of paper in the target ream) × Weight of the source ream ÷ (Number of sheets of paper in the source ream × Area of one sheet of paper in the source ream) (Note: This formula and the previous formula are essentially the same, with the only difference being the inclusion of the numbers of sheets of paper in both the source ream and the target ream. Technically, the numbers of sheets of paper should also be included in the previous formula. However, since the numbers of sheets of paper in the two reams will be cancelled out if they are the same, they can be omitted in the previous formula.)

To convert between the basis weights of the same paper with different basis‑ream sizes (e. g., from lb large post 480 to lb large post 500), one may either use the previous formula or the one below:

Weight of the source ream × Applicable conversion factor from the table below

To → From ↓	480	500	504	516
480	...	1.042	1.05	1.075
500	0.96	...	1.01	1.032
504	0.95	0.992	...	1.022
516	0.93	0.969	0.977	...

To convert from a basis weight to its equivalent grammage, the following is the applicable formula:

Weight of the basis ream × 703,125 ÷ Area of one sheet of paper in the basis ream in square inch × Number of sheets of paper in the basis ream

To convert from grammage to the equivalent basis weight, the formula below can be used:

Area of one sheet of paper in the basis ream in square inch × Number of sheets of paper in the basis ream × Value of gram per square metre ÷ 703,125

Utilising the aforementioned formulae, it is possible to work out the conversion factors for converting between various British and American units of basis weight and the gram per square metre:

Table of conversion factors for British units of basis weight (standardised basis sizes and 500‑sheet basis reams only) and their metric and American equivalents
Note 1: Value of lb demy × Relevant conversion factor = Value of the unit in the left column Note 2: Value of a unit in the left column ÷ Relevant conversion factor = Value of lb demy Note 3: To convert between any two units in the left column, Value of the source unit × (Conversion factor for the target unit ÷ Conversion factor for the source unit) Note 4: Note that, as a matter of mathematical relationship, 1 'single' unit (e. g., lb foolscap) is always equal to 2 'double' unit (e. g., lb double foolscap) and 4 'quad' unit (e. g., lb quad foolscap), respectively. By the same token, 1 'double' unit is always equal to 1/2 'single' unit and 2 'quad' unit, respectively; and 1 'quad' unit is always equal to 1/2 'double' unit and 1/4 'single' unit, respectively. Due to the rounding of the conversion factors in this table, calculating with the conversion factors alone may not produce such results automatically.
	lb demy (Note: The pound per ream of demy paper has been chosen as the base unit because there is a tradition of using demy as the default paper size for basis weight: in the British paper industry, there was a device, called 'demy scale', that was used to measure the weights of paper samples in pound per ream of demy paper (480‑sheet, 500‑sheet, and 516‑sheet reams).) (UK)
lb bag cap (UK)	1.219047
lb casing (the definition on the island of Great Britain) (UK)	4.205713
lb casing (the definition on the island of Ireland) (UK)	4.388570
lb double crown (UK)	1.523809
lb double demy (UK)	2
lb double double imperial (UK)	6.628570
lb double elephant (UK)	2.742856
lb double foolscap (UK)	1.165714
lb double imperial (writing and printing) (UK)	3.352380
lb double imperial (wrapping) (UK)	3.314285
lb double large post (UK)	1.759999
lb double medium (UK)	2.102856
lb double post (UK)	1.447619
lb double royal (UK)	2.539681
lb double small demy (UK)	1.574603
lb double small foolscap (UK)	1.110475
lb extra large casing (UK)	4.876188
lb foolscap (UK)	0.582857
lb imperial (writing and printing) (UK)	1.676190
lb imperial (wrapping) (UK)	1.657142
lb large post (UK)	0.880000
lb large royal (UK)	1.405713
lb medium (UK)	1.051428
lb post (UK)	0.723809
lb quad crown (UK)	3.047619
lb quad demy (UK)	4
lb quad foolscap (UK)	2.331429
lb royal (UK)	1.269840
lb saddleback (UK)	4.114285
lb sheet‑and‑a‑half small foolscap (UK)	0.832857
lb sheet‑and‑a‑third small foolscap (UK)	0.740317
lb small demy (UK)	0.787301
lb small foolscap (UK)	0.555237
lb small royal (UK)	1.158094
gsm (metric)	3.571142
lb bond (US)	0.949841
lb Bristol (US)	1.628571
lb cover (US)	1.320634
lb index (US)	1.975236
lb tag (US)	2.194284
lb text (US)	2.412696

Table of conversion factors for British units of basis weight (all basis sizes and basis‑ream sizes) and their metric and American equivalents
Note 1: Value of lb demy 500 × Relevant conversion factor = Value of the unit in the left column Note 2: Value of a unit in the left column ÷ Relevant conversion factor = Value of lb demy 500 Note 3: To convert between any two units in the left column, Value of the source unit × (Conversion factor for the target unit ÷ Conversion factor for the source unit) Note 4: Note that, as a matter of mathematical relationship, as long as the ream size is the same, 1 'single' unit (e. g., lb crown 500) is always equal to 2 'double' unit (e. g., lb double crown 500) and 4 'quad' unit (e. g., lb quad crown 500), respectively. By the same token, 1 'double' unit is always equal to 1/2 'single' unit and 2 'quad' unit, respectively; and 1 'quad' unit is always equal to 1/2 'double' unit and 1/4 'single' unit, respectively. Due to the rounding of the conversion factors in this table, calculating with the conversion factors alone may not produce such results automatically.
	lb demy 500 (Note: The pound per 500‑sheet ream of demy paper has been chosen as the base unit for two reasons. Firstly, there is a tradition of using demy as the default paper size for basis weight: in the British paper industry, there was a device, called 'demy scale', that was used to measure the weights of paper samples in pound per ream of demy paper (480‑sheet, 500‑sheet, and 516‑sheet reams). Secondly, 500 sheets is both the modern standard definition of the ream and one of the traditional British basis‑ream sizes.) (UK)
lb atlas 480 (UK)	2.155275
lb atlas 500 (UK)	2.245079
lb atlas 504 (UK)	2.263039
lb atlas 516 (UK)	2.316921
lb bag cap 480 (the pre–‍1937 standardisation definition) (UK)	1.141027
lb bag cap 500 (the pre–‍1937 standardisation definition) (UK)	1.188571
lb bag cap 504 (the pre–‍1937 standardisation definition) (UK)	1.198079
lb bag cap 516 (the pre–‍1937 standardisation definition) (UK)	1.226605
lb bag cap 480 (UK)	1.170285
lb bag cap 500 (UK)	1.219047
lb bag cap 504 (UK)	1.228799
lb bag cap 516 (UK)	1.258056
lb casing 480 (definition on the island of Great Britain) (UK)	4.037483
lb casing 500 (definition on the island of Great Britain) (UK)	4.205713
lb casing 504 (definition on the island of Great Britain) (UK)	4.239357
lb casing 516 (definition on the island of Great Britain) (UK)	4.340294
lb casing 480 (definition on the island of Ireland) (UK)	4.213026
lb casing 500 (definition on the island of Ireland) (UK)	4.388570
lb casing 504 (definition on the island of Ireland) (UK)	4.423677
lb casing 516 (definition on the island of Ireland) (UK)	4.529003
lb copy 480 (UK)	0.804571
lb copy 500 (UK)	0.838095
lb copy 504 (UK)	0.844799
lb copy 516 (UK)	0.864914
lb crown 480 (UK)	0.731428
lb crown 500 (UK)	0.761905
lb crown 504 (UK)	0.768000
lb crown 516 (UK)	0.786285
lb demy 480 (UK)	0.960000
lb demy 504 (UK)	1.008000
lb demy 516 (UK)	1.032000
lb double bag cap 480 (UK)	2.282055
lb double bag cap 500 (UK)	2.377142
lb double bag cap 504 (UK)	2.396159
lb double bag cap 516 (UK)	2.453210
lb double crown 480 (UK)	1.462856
lb double crown 500 (UK)	1.523809
lb double crown 504 (UK)	1.535999
lb double crown 516 (UK)	1.572571
lb double demy 480 (UK)	1.919999
lb double demy 500 (UK)	2
lb double demy 504 (UK)	2.015999
lb double demy 516 (UK)	2.063999
lb double double imperial 480 (UK)	6.363425
lb double double imperial 500 (UK)	6.628570
lb double double imperial 504 (UK)	6.681596
lb double double imperial 516 (UK)	6.840682
lb double elephant (writing and printing) 480 (UK)	2.633141
lb double elephant (writing and printing) 500 (UK)	2.742856
lb double elephant (writing and printing) 504 (UK)	2.764798
lb double elephant (writing and printing) 516 (UK)	2.830627
lb double elephant (wrapping) 480 (UK)	3.476721
lb double elephant (wrapping) 500 (UK)	3.621586
lb double elephant (wrapping) 504 (UK)	3.650557
lb double elephant (wrapping) 516 (UK)	3.737475
lb double foolscap 480 (UK)	1.119085
lb double foolscap 500 (UK)	1.165714
lb double foolscap 504 (UK)	1.175040
lb double foolscap 516 (UK)	1.203017
lb double globe 480 (UK)	2.594132
lb double globe 500 (UK)	2.702221
lb double globe 504 (UK)	2.723838
lb double globe 516 (UK)	2.788691
lb double imperial (writing and printing) 480 (UK)	3.218284
lb double imperial (writing and printing) 500 (UK)	3.352380
lb double imperial (writing and printing) 504 (UK)	3.379198
lb double imperial (writing and printing) 516 (UK)	3.459655
lb double imperial (wrapping) 480 (UK)	3.181712
lb double imperial (wrapping) 500 (UK)	3.314285
lb double imperial (wrapping) 504 (UK)	3.340798
lb double imperial (wrapping) 516 (UK)	3.420341
lb double large post 480 (UK)	1.689599
lb double large post 500 (UK)	1.759999
lb double large post 504 (UK)	1.774079
lb double large post 516 (UK)	1.816319
lb double medium 480 (UK)	2.018741
lb double medium 500 (UK)	2.102856
lb double medium 504 (UK)	2.119678
lb double medium 516 (UK)	2.170147
lb double post (writing) 480 (the pre–‍1937 standardisation definition) (UK)	1.412875
lb double post (writing) 500 (the pre–‍1937 standardisation definition) (UK)	1.471745
lb double post (writing) 504 (the pre–‍1937 standardisation definition) (UK)	1.483518
lb double post (writing) 516 (the pre–‍1937 standardisation definition) (UK)	1.518840
lb double post (printing) 480 (the pre–‍1937 standardisation definition) (UK)	1.454932
lb double post (printing) 500 (the pre–‍1937 standardisation definition) (UK)	1.515555
lb double post (printing) 504 (the pre–‍1937 standardisation definition) (UK)	1.527679
lb double post (printing) 516 (the pre–‍1937 standardisation definition) (UK)	1.564052
lb double post 480 (UK)	1.389714
lb double post 500 (UK)	1.447619
lb double post 504 (UK)	1.459199
lb double post 516 (UK)	1.493942
lb double pott 480 (UK)	0.914285
lb double pott 500 (UK)	0.952380
lb double pott 504 (UK)	0.959999
lb double pott 516 (UK)	0.982856
lb double royal 480 (UK)	2.438093
lb double royal 500 (UK)	2.539681
lb double royal 504 (UK)	2.559998
lb double royal 516 (UK)	2.620950
lb double small cap 480 (UK)	2.072379
lb double small cap 500 (UK)	2.158729
lb double small cap 504 (UK)	2.175998
lb double small cap 516 (UK)	2.227808
lb double small demy 480 (UK)	1.511618
lb double small demy 500 (UK)	1.574603
lb double small demy 504 (UK)	1.587199
lb double small demy 516 (UK)	1.624990
lb double small foolscap 480 (UK)	1.066056
lb double small foolscap 500 (UK)	1.110475
lb double small foolscap 504 (UK)	1.119359
lb double small foolscap 516 (UK)	1.146010
lb double small hand 480 (UK)	1.414095
lb double small hand 500 (UK)	1.473016
lb double small hand 504 (UK)	1.484799
lb double small hand 516 (UK)	1.520152
lb double small royal 480 (UK)	2.223541
lb double small royal 500 (UK)	2.316189
lb double small royal 504 (UK)	2.334718
lb double small royal 516 (UK)	2.620950
lb elephant (writing and printing) 480 (UK)	1.570132
lb elephant (writing and printing) 500 (UK)	1.635555
lb elephant (writing and printing) 504 (UK)	1.648639
lb elephant (writing and printing) 516 (UK)	1.687892
lb elephant (wrapping) 480 (UK)	1.872456
lb elephant (wrapping) 500 (UK)	1.950475
lb elephant (wrapping) 504 (UK)	1.966078
lb elephant (wrapping) 516 (UK)	2.012890
lb extra large casing 480 (UK)	4.681139
lb extra large casing 500 (UK)	4.876188
lb extra large casing 504 (UK)	4.915196
lb extra large casing 516 (UK)	5.032225
lb foolscap 480 (UK)	0.559543
lb foolscap 500 (UK)	0.582857
lb foolscap 504 (UK)	0.587520
lb foolscap 516 (UK)	0.601508
lb haven cap 480 (UK)	1.331199
lb haven cap 500 (UK)	1.386666
lb haven cap 504 (UK)	1.397759
lb haven cap 516 (UK)	1.431039
lb imperial (writing and printing) 480 (UK)	1.609142
lb imperial (writing and printing) 500 (UK)	1.676190
lb imperial (writing and printing) 504 (UK)	1.689599
lb imperial (writing and printing) 516 (UK)	1.729827
lb imperial (wrapping) 480 (UK)	1.590856
lb imperial (wrapping) 500 (UK)	1.657142
lb imperial (wrapping) 504 (UK)	1.670399
lb imperial (wrapping) 516 (UK)	1.710170
lb Kent cap 480 (UK)	0.959999
lb Kent cap 500 (UK)	0.999999
lb Kent cap 504 (UK)	1.007999
lb Kent cap 516 (UK)	1.031999
lb large post 480 (UK)	0.844799
lb large post 500 (UK)	0.880000
lb large post 504 (UK)	0.887039
lb large post 516 (UK)	0.908159
lb large royal 480 (the pre–‍1937 standardisation definition) (UK)	1.316571
lb large royal 500 (the pre–‍1937 standardisation definition) (UK)	1.371428
lb large royal 504 (the pre–‍1937 standardisation definition) (UK)	1.382399
lb large royal 516 (the pre–‍1937 standardisation definition) (UK)	1.415314
lb large royal 480 (UK)	1.349484
lb large royal 500 (UK)	1.405713
lb large royal 504 (UK)	1.416958
lb large royal 516 (UK)	1.450696
lb lumber hand 480 (UK)	0.960000
lb lumber hand 500 (UK)	1
lb lumber hand 504 (UK)	1.008000
lb lumber hand 516 (UK)	1.032000
lb medium 480 (UK)	1.009371
lb medium 500 (UK)	1.051428
lb medium 504 (UK)	1.059839
lb medium 516 (UK)	1.085073
lb music demy 480 (UK)	0.727238
lb music demy 500 (UK)	0.757540
lb music demy 504 (UK)	0.763600
lb music demy 516 (UK)	0.781781
lb pinched post 480 (UK)	0.665295
lb pinched post 500 (UK)	0.693016
lb pinched post 504 (UK)	0.698559
lb pinched post 516 (UK)	0.715192
lb post (writing) 480 (the pre–‍1925 standardisation definition) (UK)	0.706437
lb post (writing) 500 (the pre–‍1925 standardisation definition) (UK)	0.735872
lb post (writing) 504 (the pre–‍1925 standardisation definition) (UK)	0.741759
lb post (writing) 516 (the pre–‍1925 standardisation definition) (UK)	0.759420
lb post (printing) 480 (the pre–‍1925 standardisation definition) (UK)	0.727466
lb post (printing) 500 (the pre–‍1925 standardisation definition) (UK)	0.757777
lb post (printing) 504 (the pre–‍1925 standardisation definition) (UK)	0.763839
lb post (printing) 516 (the pre–‍1925 standardisation definition) (UK)	0.782026
lb post 480 (UK)	0.694857
lb post 500 (UK)	0.723809
lb post 504 (UK)	0.729600
lb post 516 (UK)	0.746971
lb pott 480 (UK)	0.457143
lb pott 500 (UK)	0.476191
lb pott 504 (UK)	0.480000
lb pott 516 (UK)	0.491429
lb quad crown 480 (UK)	2.925713
lb quad crown 500 (UK)	3.047619
lb quad crown 504 (UK)	3.071998
lb quad crown 516 (UK)	3.145141
lb quad demy 480 (UK)	3.839999
lb quad demy 500 (UK)	4
lb quad demy 504 (UK)	4.031999
lb quad demy 516 (UK)	4.127999
lb quad foolscap 480 (UK)	2.238171
lb quad foolscap 500 (UK)	2.331429
lb quad foolscap 504 (UK)	2.350080
lb quad foolscap 516 (UK)	2.406034
lb quad globe 480 (UK)	5.188263
lb quad globe 500 (UK)	5.404442
lb quad globe 504 (UK)	5.447676
lb quad globe 516 (UK)	5.577383
lb quad pott 480 (UK)	1.828572
lb quad pott 500 (UK)	1.904763
lb quad pott 504 (UK)	1.920000
lb quad pott 516 (UK)	1.965715
lb quad royal 480 (UK)	4.876186
lb quad royal 500 (UK)	5.079362
lb quad royal 504 (UK)	5.119995
lb quad royal 516 (UK)	5.241900
lb quad small hand 480 (UK)	2.925712
lb quad small hand 500 (UK)	3.047618
lb quad small hand 504 (UK)	3.071998
lb quad small hand 516 (UK)	3.145140
lb royal 480 (UK)	1.219046
lb royal 500 (UK)	1.269840
lb royal 504 (UK)	1.279999
lb royal 516 (UK)	1.310475
lb saddleback 480 (UK)	3.949712
lb saddleback 500 (UK)	4.114285
lb saddleback 504 (UK)	4.147198
lb saddleback 516 (UK)	4.245940
lb sheet‑and‑a‑half small foolscap 480 (the pre–‍1925 standardisation definition) (UK)	0.791466
lb sheet‑and‑a‑half small foolscap 500 (the pre–‍1925 standardisation definition) (UK)	0.824444
lb sheet‑and‑a‑half small foolscap 504 (the pre–‍1925 standardisation definition) (UK)	0.831040
lb sheet‑and‑a‑half small foolscap 516 (the pre–‍1925 standardisation definition) (UK)	0.850826
lb sheet‑and‑a‑half small foolscap 480 (UK)	0.799543
lb sheet‑and‑a‑half small foolscap 500 (UK)	0.832857
lb sheet‑and‑a‑half small foolscap 504 (UK)	0.839520
lb sheet‑and‑a‑half small foolscap 516 (UK)	0.859508
lb sheet‑and‑a‑third small foolscap 480 (UK)	0.710704
lb sheet‑and‑a‑third small foolscap 500 (UK)	0.740317
lb sheet‑and‑a‑third small foolscap 504 (UK)	0.746240
lb sheet‑and‑a‑third small foolscap 516 (UK)	0.764007
lb small cap 480 (UK)	1.036190
lb small cap 500 (UK)	1.079364
lb small cap 504 (UK)	1.087999
lb small cap 516 (UK)	1.113904
lb small demy 480 (UK)	0.755809
lb small demy 500 (UK)	0.787301
lb small demy 504 (UK)	0.793599
lb small demy 516 (UK)	0.812495
lb small foolscap 480 (UK)	0.533028
lb small foolscap 500 (UK)	0.555237
lb small foolscap 504 (UK)	0.559679
lb small foolscap 516 (UK)	0.573005
lb small hand 480 (UK)	0.731428
lb small hand 500 (UK)	0.761905
lb small hand 504 (UK)	0.768000
lb small hand 516 (UK)	0.786285
lb small medium 480 (UK)	0.938666
lb small medium 500 (UK)	0.977777
lb small medium 504 (UK)	0.985599
lb small medium 516 (UK)	1.009066
lb small post 480 (UK)	0.654018
lb small post 500 (UK)	0.681269
lb small post 504 (UK)	0.686719
lb small post 516 (UK)	0.703070
lb small royal 480 (UK)	1.111770
lb small royal 500 (UK)	1.158094
lb small royal 504 (UK)	1.167359
lb small royal 516 (UK)	1.195153
lb super royal (writing) 480 (the pre–‍1925 standardisation definition) (UK)	1.267199
lb super royal (writing) 500 (the pre–‍1925 standardisation definition) (UK)	1.319999
lb super royal (writing) 504 (the pre–‍1925 standardisation definition) (UK)	1.330559
lb super royal (writing) 516 (the pre–‍1925 standardisation definition) (UK)	1.362239
lb super royal (printing) 480 (the pre–‍1925 standardisation definition) (UK)	1.374475
lb super royal (printing) 500 (the pre–‍1925 standardisation definition) (UK)	1.431745
lb super royal (printing) 504 (the pre–‍1925 standardisation definition) (UK)	1.443199
lb super royal (printing) 516 (the pre–‍1925 standardisation definition) (UK)	1.477561
lb super royal 480 (UK)	1.250742
lb super royal 500 (UK)	1.302856
lb super royal 504 (UK)	1.313279
lb super royal 516 (UK)	1.344547
lb 20″ by 24″ 480 (UK)	1.170285
lb 20″ by 24″ 500 (UK)	1.219047
lb 20″ by 24″ 504 (UK)	1.228799
lb 20″ by 24″ 516 (UK)	1.258056
lb 20″ by 28″ 480 (UK)	1.365333
lb 20″ by 28″ 500 (UK)	1.422222
lb 20″ by 28″ 504 (UK)	1.433599
lb 20″ by 28″ 516 (UK)	1.467733
lb 21″ by 31″ 480 (UK)	1.587199
lb 21″ by 31″ 500 (UK)	1.653333
lb 21″ by 31″ 504 (UK)	1.666559
lb 21″ by 31″ 516 (UK)	1.706239
lb 21″ by 34″ 480 (UK)	1.740799
lb 21″ by 34″ 500 (UK)	1.813333
lb 21″ by 34″ 504 (UK)	1.827839
lb 21″ by 34″ 516 (UK)	1.871359
lb 22″ by 32″ 480 (UK)	1.716418
lb 22″ by 32″ 500 (UK)	1.787936
lb 22″ by 32″ 504 (UK)	1.802239
lb 22″ by 32″ 516 (UK)	1.845149
lb 22″ by 35″ 480 (UK)	1.877332
lb 22″ by 35″ 500 (UK)	1.955555
lb 22″ by 35″ 504 (UK)	1.971198
lb 22″ by 35″ 516 (UK)	2.018132
lb 23″ by 34″ 480 (UK)	1.906589
lb 23″ by 34″ 500 (UK)	1.986031
lb 23″ by 34″ 504 (UK)	2.001918
lb 23″ by 34″ 516 (UK)	2.049583
lb 24″ by 30″ 480 (UK)	1.755427
lb 24″ by 30″ 500 (UK)	1.828571
lb 24″ by 30″ 504 (UK)	1.843199
lb 24″ by 30″ 516 (UK)	1.887084
lb 24″ by 36″ 480 (UK)	2.106512
lb 24″ by 36″ 500 (UK)	2.194284
lb 24″ by 36″ 504 (UK)	2.211838
lb 24″ by 36″ 516 (UK)	2.264501
lb 24″ by 40″ 480 (UK)	2.340569
lb 24″ by 40″ 500 (UK)	2.438094
lb 24″ by 40″ 504 (UK)	2.457598
lb 24″ by 40″ 516 (UK)	2.516112
lb 26″ by 36″ 480 (UK)	2.282056
lb 26″ by 36″ 500 (UK)	2.377142
lb 26″ by 36″ 504 (UK)	2.396159
lb 26″ by 36″ 516 (UK)	2.453210
lb 28″ by 45″ 480 (UK)	3.071998
lb 28″ by 45″ 500 (UK)	3.199999
lb 28″ by 45″ 504 (UK)	3.225598
lb 28″ by 45″ 516 (UK)	3.302398
lb 29″ by 44″ 480 (UK)	3.111008
lb 29″ by 44″ 500 (UK)	3.240634
lb 29″ by 44″ 504 (UK)	3.266558
lb 29″ by 44″ 516 (UK)	3.344333
lb 30″ by 38″ 480 (UK)	2.779426
lb 30″ by 38″ 500 (UK)	2.895237
lb 30″ by 38″ 504 (UK)	2.918398
lb 30″ by 38″ 516 (UK)	2.987883
lb 30″ by 46″ 480 (UK)	3.364569
lb 30″ by 46″ 500 (UK)	3.504761
lb 30″ by 46″ 504 (UK)	3.532798
lb 30″ by 46″ 516 (UK)	3.616912
lb 34″ by 36″ 480 (UK)	2.984227
lb 34″ by 36″ 500 (UK)	3.108571
lb 34″ by 36″ 504 (UK)	3.133438
lb 34″ by 36″ 516 (UK)	3.208044
lb 36″ by 36″ 480 (UK)	3.159770
lb 36″ by 36″ 500 (UK)	3.291428
lb 36″ by 36″ 504 (UK)	3.317758
lb 36″ by 36″ 516 (UK)	3.396752
lb 36″ by 48″ 480 (UK)	4.213026
lb 36″ by 48″ 500 (UK)	4.388570
lb 36″ by 48″ 504 (UK)	4.423677
lb 36″ by 48″ 516 (UK)	4.529003
lb 38″ by 48″ 480 (UK)	4.447083
lb 38″ by 48″ 500 (UK)	4.632379
lb 38″ by 48″ 504 (UK)	4.669437
lb 38″ by 48″ 516 (UK)	4.780614
lb 45″ by 56″ 480 (UK)	6.143996
lb 45″ by 56″ 500 (UK)	6.399998
lb 45″ by 56″ 504 (UK)	6.451196
lb 45″ by 56″ 516 (UK)	6.604796
gsm (metric)	3.571142
lb bond (US)	0.949841
lb Bristol (US)	1.628571
lb cover (US)	1.320634
lb index (US)	1.975236
lb tag (US)	2.194284
lb text (US)	2.412696

Using British basis sizes and the 500‑sheet basis‑ream (a traditional British basis‑ream size that coincides with the modern standard definition of 'ream'), and with the help of the aforementioned conversion formulae or conversion factors, it is possible to express the paper weights of different types of paper in everyday life using British units of basis weight: the typical photocopier paper that is used as all‑purpose paper is 17 1/4 or 19 3/4lb large post (70 or 80gsm); personal and business letter paper, especially that with engraved letterheads, is typically 24 3/4–29 1/2lb large post (100–120gsm); greetings cards are usually 85 1/4–106 3/4lb double crown (200–250gsm); newspaper paper is typically 15–23 1/2lb double crown (35–55gsm); business cards are usually 128–149 1/4lb double crown (300–350gsm); two‑ply toilet rolls and paper kitchen towels are 7 3/4lb double crown (31gsm) (Note: For example, Kleenex toilet paper.) (both layers combined) and 17lb double crown (40gsm), (Note: For example, a paper kitchen towel.) respectively; and the typical department‑store wrapping paper is commonly 46 1/2–65lb double imperial (50–70gsm). (Note: For example, wrapping paper.) In the traditional British system, large post, double crown, and double imperial are common British basis sizes for writing paper, printing paper and other paper that is not writing or wrapping paper, and wrapping paper, respectively. '500' is omitted because it is clear from the context that a 'ream' is 500 sheets.

== Caliper ==
Paper thickness, or caliper, is a common measurement specified and required for certain printing applications. Since a paper's density is typically not directly known or specified, the thickness of any sheet of paper cannot be calculated by any method. Instead, it is measured and specified separately as its caliper. However, paper thickness for most typical business papers might be similar across comparable brands. If thickness is not specified for a paper in question, it must be either measured or guessed based on a comparable paper's specification.

Caliper is usually measured in micrometres (μm), or in the United States also in mils (1 mil = 1/1000 in = 25.4 μm). Commonly, 20-pound bond paper ranges between roughly 97 and 114 μm (0.0038 and 0.0045 in) in thickness.

The paper density is calculated by dividing the grammage over the caliper, and is usually expressed in grams per cubic centimetre (g/cm^{3}) to cancel out the mathematical need for unit conversions between metres and micrometres (a conversion factor of 1,000,000).

== See also ==
- Density
  - Area density
  - Linear density
- Envelope size
- Hole punch — filing holes
- Index card
- Paper and ink testing
- Photo print sizes
