= Paper density =

Paper product's mass per unit volume

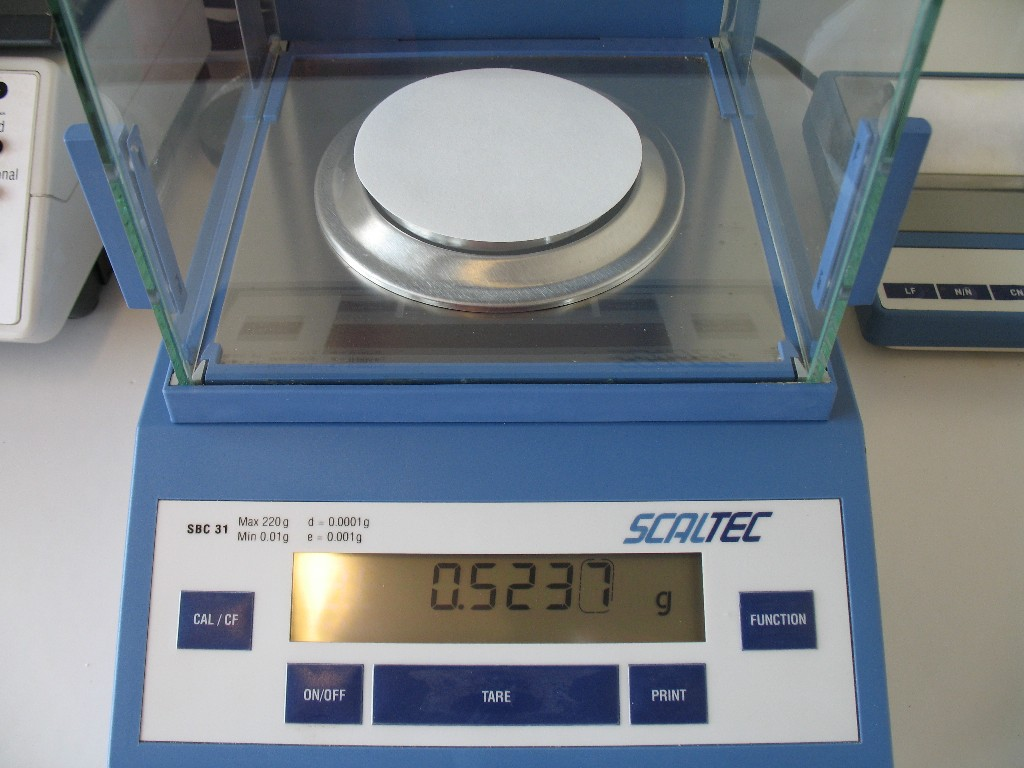
Weighing scale to determine paper weight

Paper density measures a paper product's mass per unit volume.

== Measurement ==
The density can be calculated by dividing the grammage of paper (in grams per square metre or "gsm") by its caliper (usually in micrometres, occasionally in mils).

In countries that did not adopt the metric system, paper density is often measured in basis weight. This measuring system expresses the density of paper by weighing a set number of so-called basis sheets. These are the sheets produced when the continuous paper product made by a paper mill is first cut into pieces. Basis sheets are usually 17.5 inches by 22.5 inches. Sheets of this size are then cut and trimmed into four sheets of standard 8.5" x 11" office paper or two sheets of 8.5" x 14" legal paper.

The weight in pounds of a ream of basis paper (500 sheets) is used to express the density of any paper produced from it. The term basis is sometimes abbreviated by the Latin term sub. Paper of 20 lbs basis weight will then be called "sub 20" on any subsequent packaging. More recent Imperial paper densities are most often indicated by a simple weight of one ream of basis paper, e.g., as "20 lbs", "24 pound" or "32#" paper.

The "ISO 534:2011, Paper and board — Determination of thickness, density and specific volume" indicates that the paper density is expressed in grams per cubic centimeter (g/cm^{3}).

== Perception and use ==
Some research in consumer and social psychology suggests that the weight of materials can act as a haptic cue that influences judgments (for example, impressions of "importance" or "seriousness"). In print contexts, heavier card stock is sometimes used for items such as business cards to convey a more "substantial" feel, although reported effects are context-dependent and not consistently replicated.

== See also ==
- Grammage
- Density
  - Area density
  - Linear density
- Paper bulk
