= Units of paper quantity =

Various measures of paper quantity

Various measures of paper quantity have been and are in use. Although there are no S.I. units such as quires or bales, there are ISO and DIN standards for the ream. Expressions used here include U.S. Customary Units.

== Units ==
Writing paper measurements
25 sheets = 1 quire
500 sheets = 20 quires = 1 ream
1,000 sheets = 40 quires = 2 reams = 1 bundle
5,000 sheets = 200 quires = 10 reams = 5 bundles = 1 bale
200,000 sheets = 8,000 quires = 400 reams = 200 bundles = 40 bales = 1 pallet

"Short" paper measurements
24 sheets = 1 "short" quire
480 sheets = 20 "short" quires = 1 "short" ream
960 sheets = 40 "short" quires = 2 "short" reams = 1 "short" bundle
4,800 sheets = 200 "short" quires = 10 "short" reams = 5 "short" bundles = 1 "short" bale

Posters and printing measurements
516 sheets (= 21 1/2 "short" quires) = 1 printer's ream
1,032 sheets = 2 printer's reams = 1 printer's bundle
5,160 sheets = 5 printer's bundles = 1 printer's bale

Cover and index paper
250 sheets = 1 ream

== Quire ==
A quire of paper is a measure of paper quantity. The usual meaning is 25 sheets of the same size and quality: 1/20 of a ream of 500 sheets. Quires of 25 sheets are often used for machine-made paper, while quires of 24 sheets are often used for handmade or specialised paper of 480-sheet reams. (As an old UK and US measure, in some sources, a quire was originally 24 sheets.) Quires of 15, 18 or 20 sheets have also been used, depending on the type of paper.

=== Etymology ===
The current word quire derives from Old English quair or guaer, from Old French quayer, cayer, (cf. modern French cahier), from Latin quaternum, 'by fours', 'fourfold'. Later, when bookmaking switched to using paper and it became possible to easily stitch 5 to 7 sheets at a time, the association of quaire with four was quickly lost.

=== History ===
In the Middle Ages, a quire (also called a "gathering") was most often formed of four folded sheets of vellum or parchment, i.e. eight leaves or folios, 16 sides. The term quaternion (or sometimes quaternum) designates such a quire. A quire made of a single folded sheet (i.e. two leaves, four sides) is a bifolium (plural bifolia); a binion is a quire of two sheets (i.e. four leaves, 8 sides); and a quinion is five sheets (ten leaves, 20 sides). This last meaning is preserved in the modern Italian term for quire, quinterno di carta.

Formerly, when paper was packed at the paper mill, the top and bottom quires were made up of slightly damaged sheets ("outsides") to protect the good quires ("insides"). These outside quires were known as cassie quires (from French cassée, 'broken'), or "cording quires" and had only 20 sheets to the quire. The printer Philip Luckombe in a book published in 1770 mentions both 24- and 25-sheet quires; he also details printer's wastage, and the sorting and recycling of damaged cassie quires. An 1826 French manual on typography complained that cording quires (usually containing some salvageable paper) from the Netherlands barely contained a single good sheet. (Note: A note on the flyleaf of this copy states that this edition was pirated from Didot's 1st ed. of 1825; see pp. 235–236, especially in respect of the examples of proof-reader's corrections on pp. 162–163)

It also became the name for any booklet small enough to be made from a single quire of paper. Simon Winchester, in The Surgeon of Crowthorne, cites a specific number, defining quire as "a booklet eight pages thick." Several European words for quire keep the meaning of "book of paper": German Papierbuch, Danish bog papir, Dutch bock papier.

In blankbook binding, quire is a term indicating 80 pages.

== Ream ==
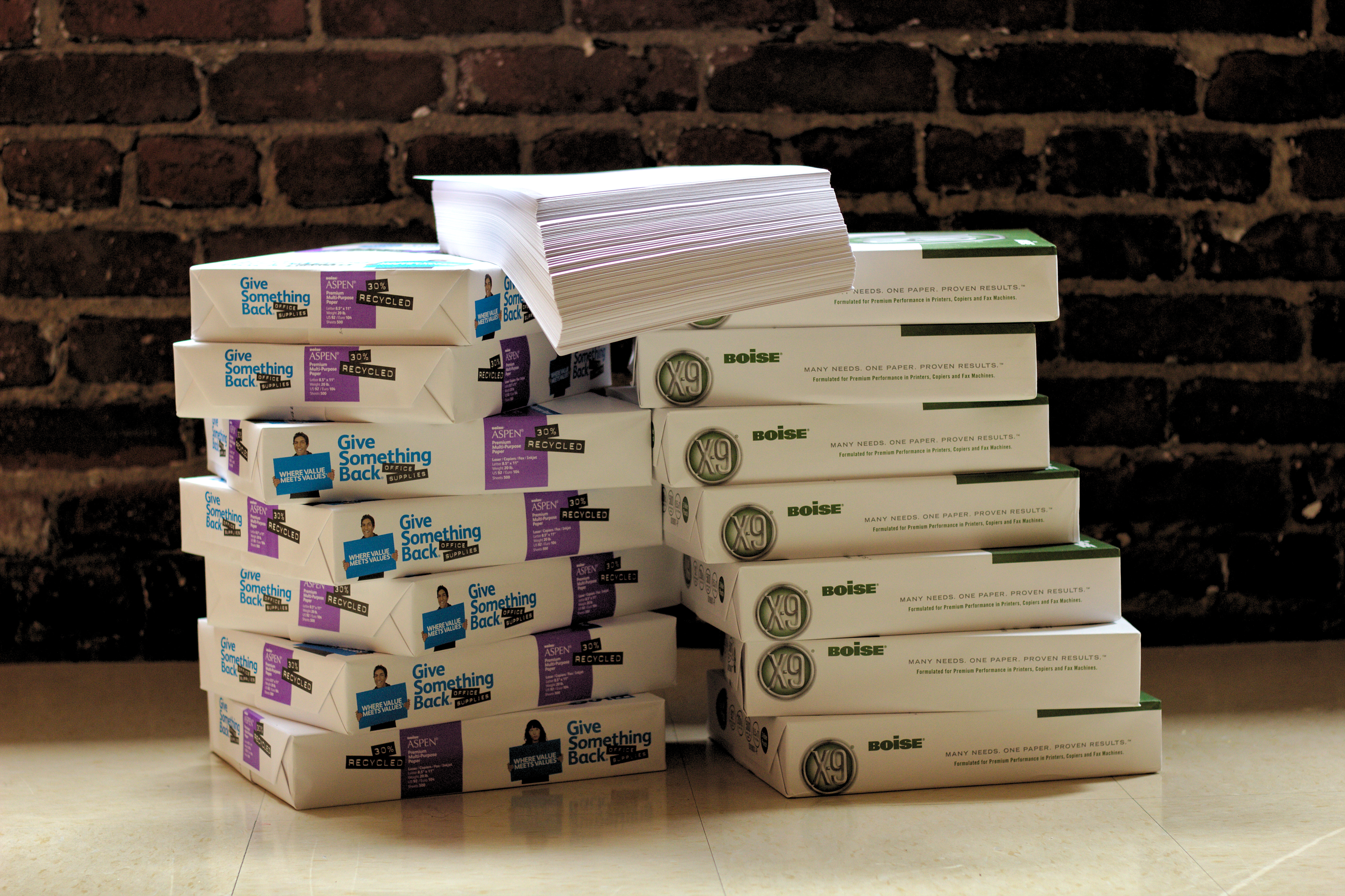
15 reams of paper

A ream of paper is a quantity of sheets of the same size and quality. International standards organizations define the ream as 500 identical sheets. (Note: ISO 4046 (see References) defines the ream as "a pack of 500 identical sheets of paper" and appends a note: "In many countries it is common practice to use the term 'ream' for other quantities, for example 480 sheets, thus affecting the quire. For quantities other than 500 sheets, a different term, such as 'pack', should be used.") This ream of 500 sheets (20 quires of 25 sheets) is also known as a "long" ream, and is gradually replacing the old value of 480 sheets, now known as a "short" ream. Reams of 472 and 516 sheets are still current, but in retail outlets paper is typically sold in reams of 500. As an old UK and US unit, a perfect ream was equal to 516 sheets.

Certain types of specialist papers such as tissue paper, greaseproof paper, handmade paper, and blotting paper are still sold (especially in the UK) in "short" reams of 480 sheets (20 quires of 24 sheets). However, the commercial use of the word "ream" for quantities of paper other than 500 is now deprecated by such standards as ISO 4046. In Europe, the DIN 6730 standard for Paper and Board includes a definition of 1 ream of A4 80 gsm (80 g/m^{2}) paper equals 500 sheets.

=== Etymology ===
The word "ream" derives from Old French reyme, from Spanish resma, from Arabic rizmah 'bundle' (of paper), from rasama, 'collect into a bundle', reflecting the Moors having brought the manufacture of cotton paper to Spain. The early variant rym (late 15c.) suggests a Dutch influence. (cf. Dutch riem), probably during the time of Spanish Habsburg control of the Netherlands.

=== History ===
The number of sheets in a ream has varied locally over the centuries, often according to the size and type of paper being sold. Reams of 500 sheets (20 quires of 25 sheets) were known in England in c. 1594; in 1706 a ream was defined as 20 quires, either 24 or 25 sheets to the quire. In 18th- and 19th-century Europe, the size of the ream varied widely. In Lombardy a ream of music paper was 450 or 480 sheets; in Britain, Holland and Germany a ream of 480 sheets was common; in the Veneto it was more frequently 500. Some paper manufacturers counted 546 sheets (21 quires of 26 sheets). J. S. Bach's manuscript paper at Weimar was ordered by the ream of 480 sheets. In 1840, a ream in Lisbon was 17 (25-sheet) quires and three sheets = 428 sheets, and a double ream was 18 (24-sheet) quires and two sheets = 434 sheets; and in Bremen, blotting or packing paper was sold in reams of 300 (20 quires of 15 sheets). A mid-19th century Milanese-Italian dictionary has an example for a risma (ream) as being either 450 or 480 sheets.

In the UK, prior to 1922, the following definitions of "ream" were in use:

- 472 sheets: a ream size for hand‑made paper only, called "mill ream" (containing 18 short quires of 24 sheets of "insides" (paper without manufacturing defects), and two cording quires of 20 sheets of "outsides" (paper with serious manufacturing defects))
- 480 sheets (then the standard ream size): a ream of paper was 480 sheets unless otherwise specified (a 480‑sheet ream consists of 20 quires of 24 sheets (a 24‑sheet quire is now called "short quires"); such a ream was also called "stationer's ream" and it is now called "short ream"); for hand‑made paper, an "insides ream" (containing either "inside" paper or retree paper (paper with minor manufacturing defects)), as opposed to mill ream, is 480 sheets
- 500 sheets: the definition of "ream" for newspaper paper (20 quires of 25 sheets; now also called "long ream")
- 504 sheets: the definition of "ream" for envelope paper (21 short quires)
- 516 sheets: the definition of "ream" for printing paper (21 1/2 short quires; also called "perfect ream" or "printer's ream")

The UK paper industry began to use the following revised definitions of "ream" on 1 January 1922:

- 500 sheets: for all machine‑made writing paper and printing paper (paper other than wrapping paper or similar paper)
- 480 sheets: for wrapping paper or similar paper, as well as insides reams of hand‑made paper
- 472 sheets: for mill reams of hand‑made paper

Since the late 20th century, the 500-sheet ream has become the de facto international standard.

== Bundle ==
A paper bundle is a quantity of sheets of paper, currently standardized as 1,000 sheets. A bundle consists of two reams or 40 quires. As an old UK and US measure, it was previously equal to 960 sheets.

When referring to chipboard, there are two standards in the US. In general, a package of approximately 50 pounds of chipboard is called a bundle. Thus, a bundle of 22 point chipboard (0.022" thick) 24" × 38", with each sheet weighing 0.556 pounds, contains 90 sheets. However, chipboard sold in size 11" × 17" and smaller is packaged and sold as bundles of 25 pounds.

== Bale ==
A paper bale is a quantity of sheets of paper, currently standardized as 5,000 sheets. A bale consists of five bundles, ten reams or 200 quires. As an old UK and US measure, it was previously equal to 4800 sheets.

== See also ==
- Book size
- History of paper
- History of printing
- Octavo
- Paper density
- Paper size
