= Flyer (pamphlet) =

Form of paper advertisement intended for wide distribution

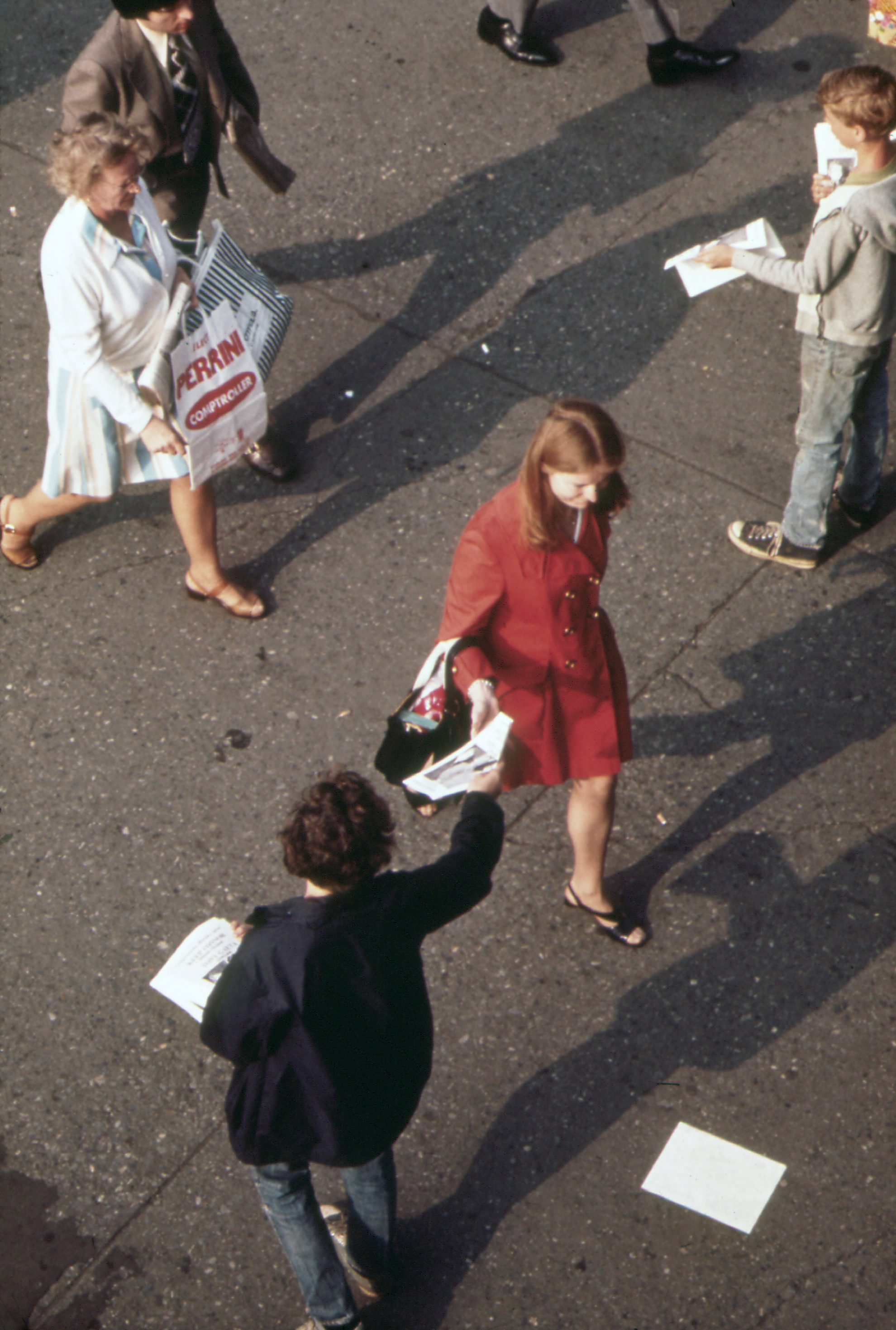
Leaflets being handed out in New York City (1973)

A flyer (or flier) is a form of paper advertisement intended for wide distribution and typically posted or distributed in a public place, handed out to individuals or sent through the mail. Today, flyers range from inexpensively photocopied leaflets to expensive, glossy, full-color circulars. Flyers in a digital format can be shared on the internet.

== Terminology ==
A flyer is also called a "palm card", "circular", "handbill", "pamphlet", "catalogue" or "leaflet".

== Usage ==
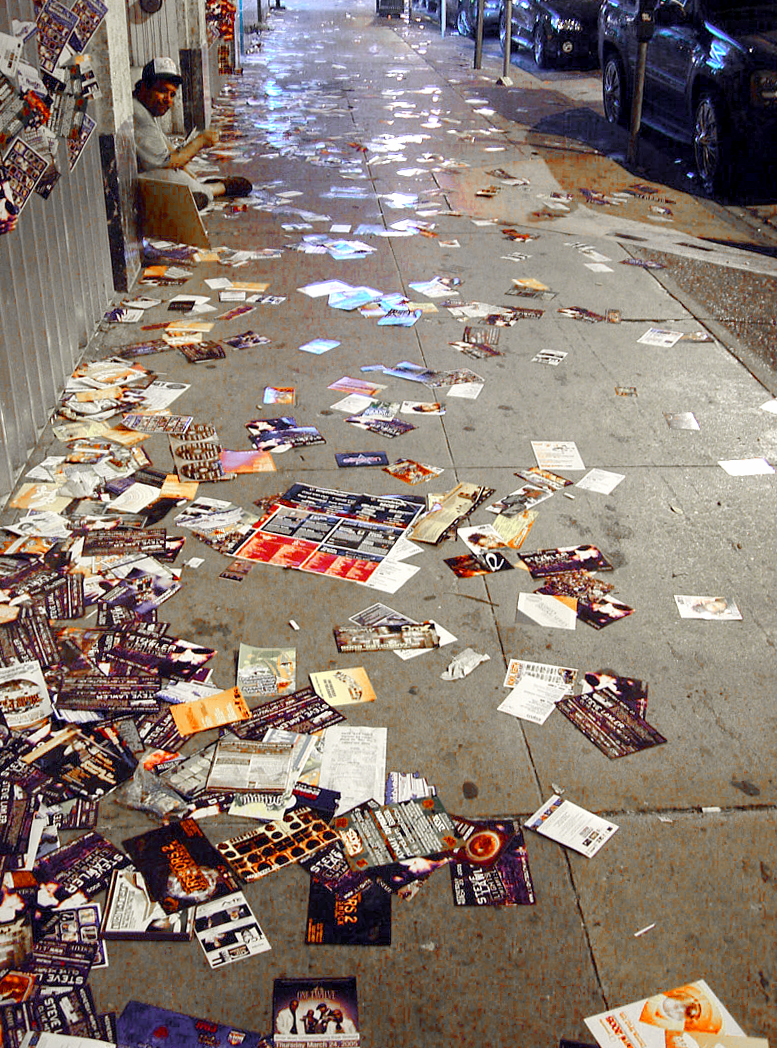
Hundreds of flyers litter the streets in South Beach, Miami. Scenes like these are not uncommon in cities known for their nightlife

Flyers may be used by individuals, businesses, not-for-profit organizations or governments to:

- Advertise an event such as a music concert, nightclub appearance, festival, or political rally.
- Promote a retail business selling goods such as a used car dealership, discount store, or a service business such as a restaurant or massage parlour.
- Persuade people about a social, religious, or political message, as in evangelism or political campaign activities on behalf of a political party or candidate during an election. Flyers have been used in armed conflict, for example airborne leaflet propaganda has been a tactic of psychological warfare.
- Recruit members for organizations or companies.

Like postcards, pamphlets and small posters, flyers are a low-cost form of mass marketing or communication. There are many different flyer formats. Some examples include:

- A4 (roughly letter size)
- A5 (roughly half-letter size)
- DL (compliments slip size)
- A6 (postcard size)

Flyers are inexpensive to produce and historically required only a basic printing press from the 18th to the 20th centuries. Their widespread use intensified in the 1990s with the spread of less expensive desktop publishing systems. Ordering flyers through traditional printing services has been supplanted by Internet services. Customers send designs, review proofs online or via e-mail and receive the final products by mail.

Flyers are not a new medium. Prior to the War of American Independence some colonists were outraged with the Stamp Act (1765) and gathered together in anti-stamp act congresses and meetings. In these congresses they had to win support and issued handbills and leaflets and pamphlets along with other written paraphernalia to do so.

Some jurisdictions have laws or ordinances banning or restricting leafleting or flyering in certain locations.

== Distribution methods ==
Flyers are disseminated through several channels. Common approaches include hand to hand leafleting, posting or static placement on permitted surfaces, delivery by post or door to door, and digital distribution.

=== Hand to hand leafleting ===
Flyers are often given directly to passersby in public places and outside venues. In the United States this activity is protected by the First Amendment and is subject to content neutral time place and manner rules. In 1939 the Supreme Court held that city bans on hand to hand distribution adopted to prevent litter were unconstitutional.

=== Posting and static placement ===
Flyers may be posted on community bulletin boards and other notice areas in libraries, universities and shops where permission has been granted. Many institutions require approval before posting and remove items that do not meet policy. Posting on public fixtures and private property is regulated in many jurisdictions. In England and Wales local authorities can designate areas where the distribution of free printed matter requires consent under the Clean Neighbourhoods and Environment Act 2005.

=== Door to door and mail ===
Flyers are delivered door to door or sent through postal services as addressed or unaddressed advertising. In the United States the United States Postal Service offers Every Door Direct Mail, which allows saturation delivery on selected carrier routes without named addresses. Federal law prohibits placing unstamped circulars or similar materials in residential letterboxes.

=== Digital distribution ===
Digital flyers mirror the printed format and are shared by email and on social media and websites. Retailers and community organizations also distribute digital versions of store or event flyers to reach audiences online.

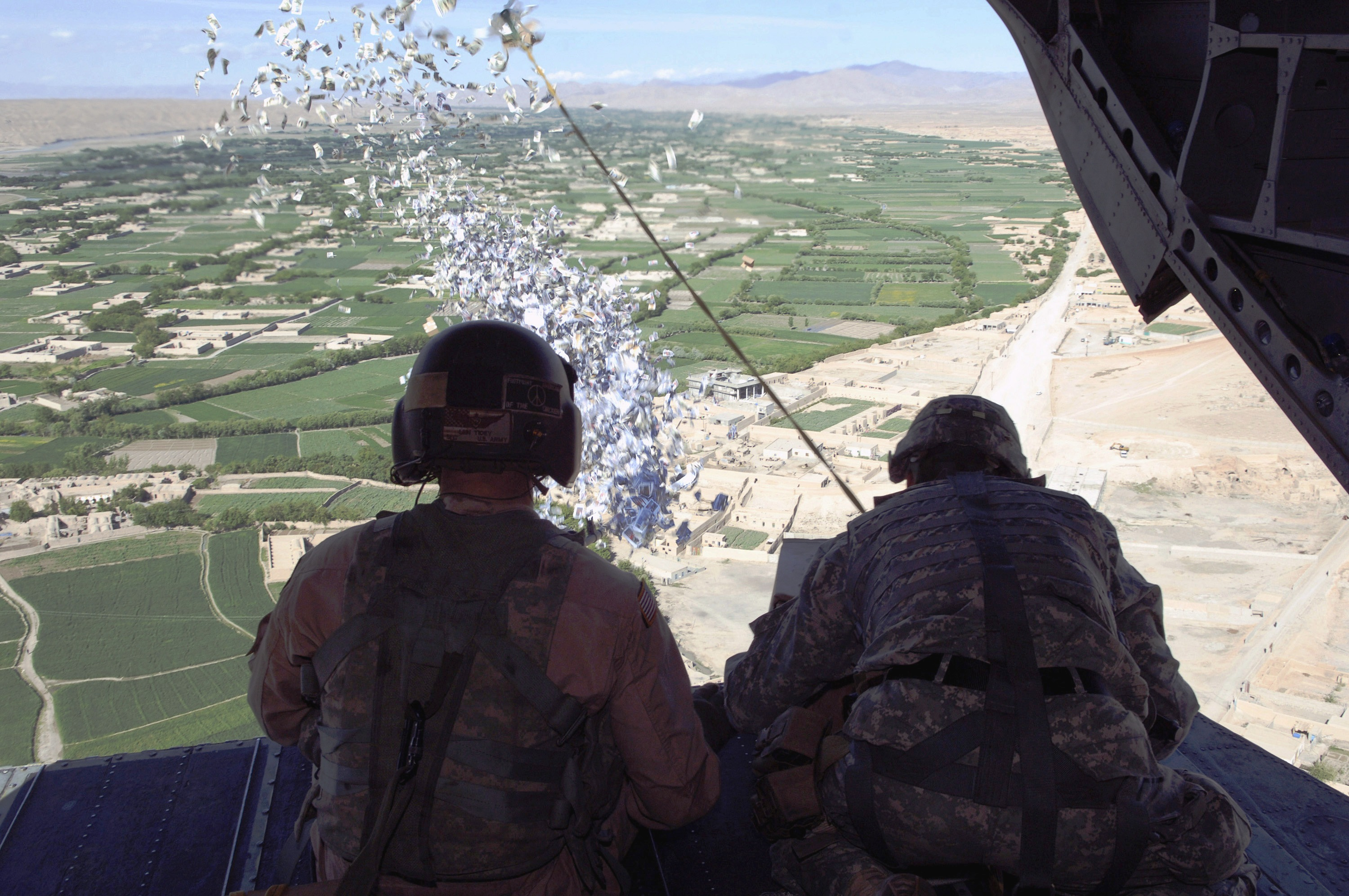
Distribution of leaflets over Afghanistan by the U.S. military in 2010

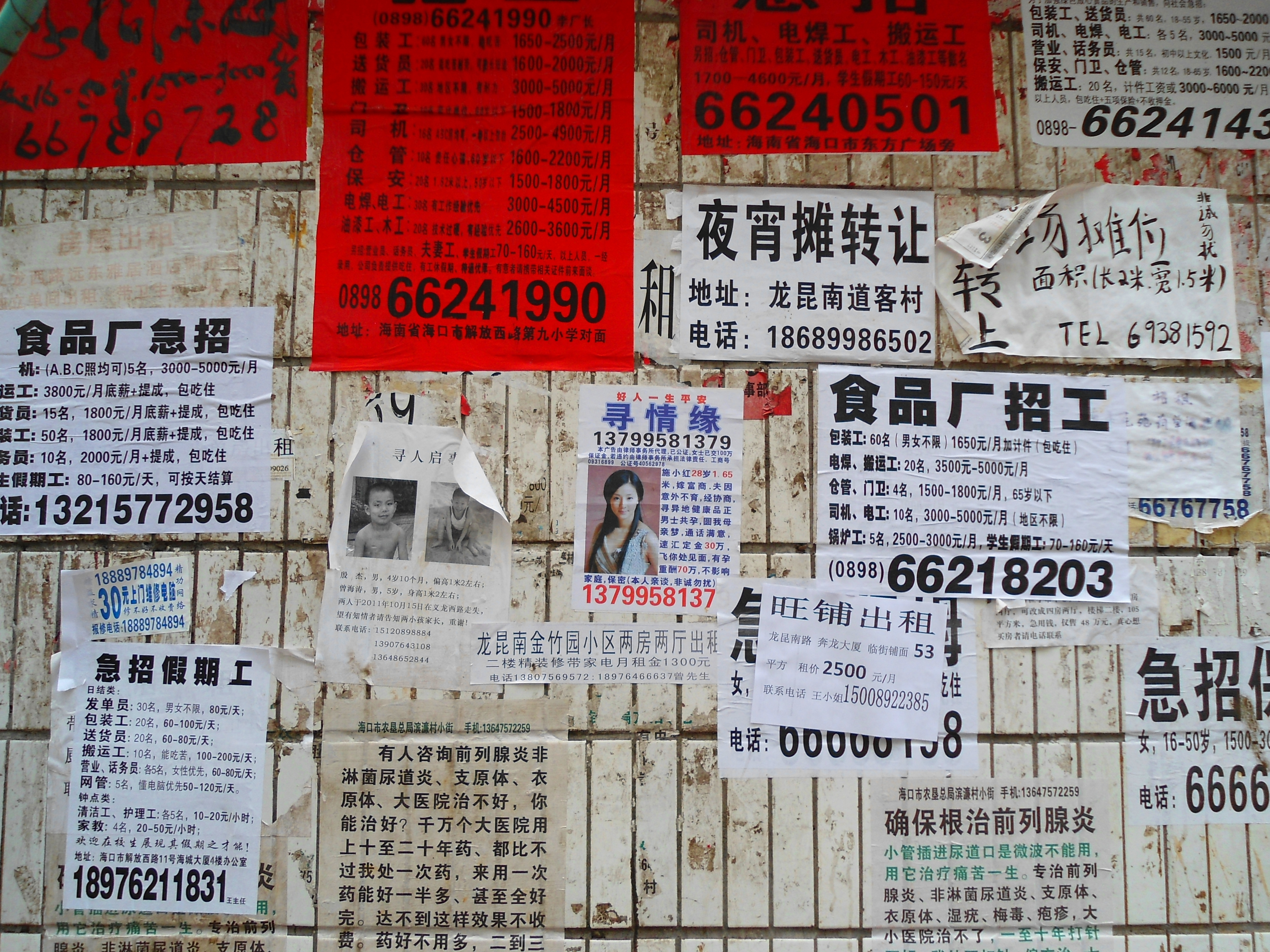
Flyers pasted to a wall in Haikou, Hainan Province, China

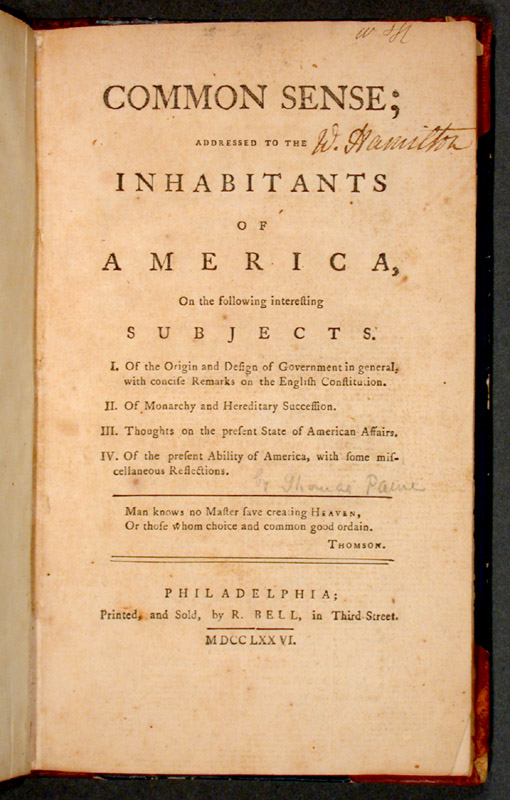
Common Sense was a pamphlet that was distributed preceding the American Revolution

== See also ==
- Canvassing
- Folded leaflet
- Street marketing
