= Business card =

Card bearing business information about a company or individual

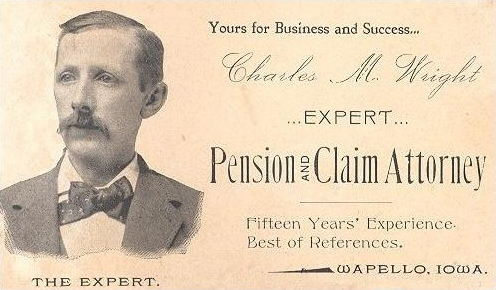
An attorney's business card, 1895

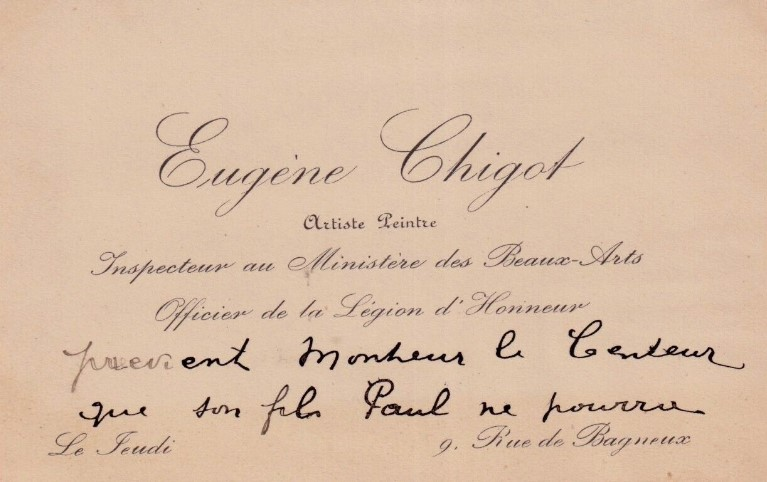
Eugène Chigot, post impressionist painter, business card 1890s

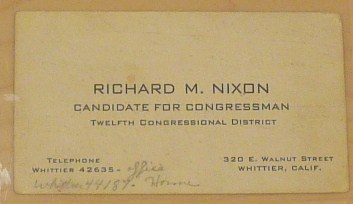
A business card from Richard Nixon's first Congressional campaign, in 1946

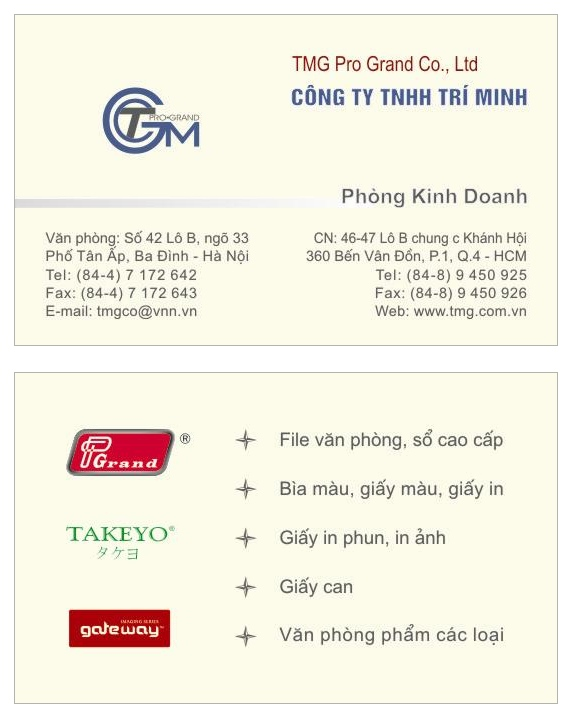
Front and back sides of a business card in Vietnam, 2008

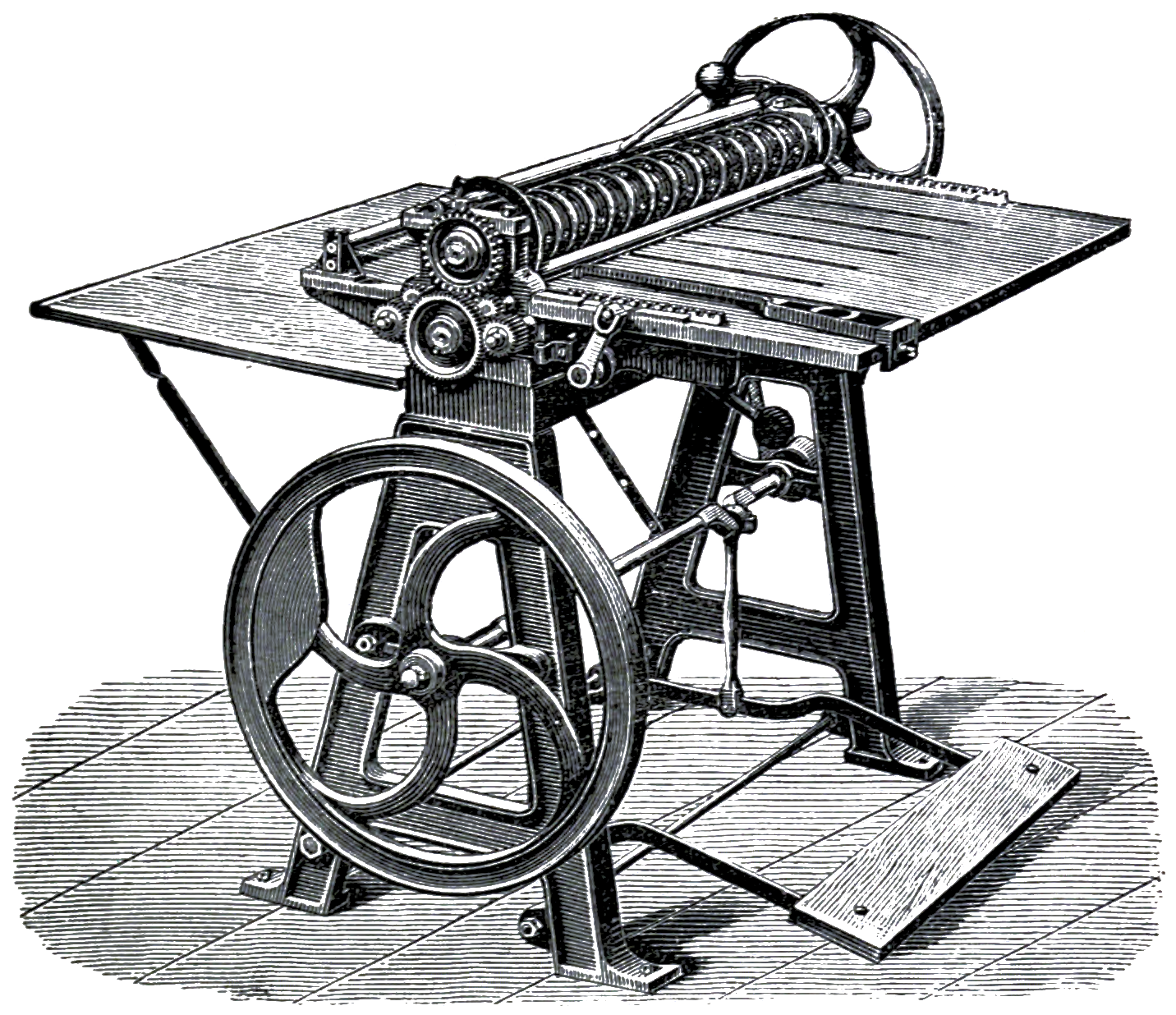
A Oscar Friedheim card cutting and scoring machine from 1889, capable of producing up to 100,000 visiting and business cards a day

Business cards are cards bearing business information about a company or individual. They are shared during formal introductions as a convenience and a memory aid. A business card typically includes the giver's name, company or business affiliation (usually with a logo) and contact information such as street addresses, telephone numbers, fax numbers, e-mail addresses and website. Before wide use of the internet, business cards also included telex details.

Now they may include social media addresses such as Facebook, LinkedIn and Twitter. Traditionally, many cards were simple black text on white stock, and the distinctive look and feel of cards printed from an engraved plate was a desirable sign of professionalism. In the late 20th century, technological advances drove changes in style, and today a professional business card will often include one or more aspects of striking visual design.

Prior to the COVID-19 pandemic, approximately 7 billion business cards were printed around the world every year. The American company Vistaprint indicates sales of the cards dropped 70 percent during the pandemic, but sales have rebounded in mid-2021.

== Construction ==
Business cards are printed on some form of card stock, the visual effect, method of printing, cost and other details varying according to cultural or organizational norms and personal preferences. The common weight of a business card varies some by location. Generally, business cards are printed on stock that is 350 g/m^{2} (density), 45 kg (100 lb) (weight), or 12 pt (thickness).

The advent of personal laser and inkjet printers made it possible for people to print business cards at home, using specially designed pre-cut stock. At first, these cards were noticeably lighter in weight, and the perforations could be felt along the edges, but improvements in the design of both printers and paper have made it possible to print cards with a professional look and feel.

High quality business cards without full-color photographs are normally printed using spot colors on sheet-fed offset printing presses. Some companies have gone so far as to trademark their spot colors (examples are UPS brown, Owens-Corning pink, and Cadbury's purple). If a business card logo is a single color and the type is another color, the process is considered two-color. More spot colors can be added depending on the needs of the card. With the onset of digital printing, and batch printing, it is now cost effective to print business cards in full color.

To simulate the effect of printing with engraved plates, a less-expensive process called thermography was developed that uses the application of a plastic powder, which adheres to the wet ink. The cards are then passed through a heating unit, which melts the plastic onto the card. Spot UV varnish onto matte laminate can also have a similar effect.

Full color cards, or cards that use many colors, are printed on sheetfed presses as well; however, they use the CMYK (cyan, magenta, yellow, and black) four-color printing process. Screens of each color overprinted on one another create a wide gamut of color. The downside to this printing method is that screened colors if examined closely will reveal tiny dots, whereas spot color cards are printed solid in most cases. Spot colors should be used for simple cards with line art or non-black type that is smaller than 5 points.

Some terminology in reference to full-color printing:

- 4/0 - Full color front / No print on back
- 4/1 - full color front / One color on reverse
- 4/4 - full color front / Full color back

These names are pronounced as "four over zero", "four over one", and "four over four".

A business card can also be coated with a UV glossy coat (offset-uv printing). The coat is applied just like another ink using an additional unit on a sheetfed press. That being said, UV coats can also be applied as a spot coating - meaning areas can be coated, and other areas can be left uncoated. This creates additional design potential. UV Coating is not to be confused with coated stock, which has a gloss or semi gloss finish that is applied before printing.

Business cards can also be printed with a digital copier, which uses toner fused onto the surface of the card; however, many modern printing firms instead utilize high-end "Digital Presses," now distinct from office copiers, which range from light production units such as the Bizhub 5500 from Konica Minolta, to state of the art units such as the latest HP Indigo Digital Presses.

While some of the older office copiers may have had problems running heavy business card stock, the newest digital presses can print on stock as heavy as 407 g/m^{2} (150# cover stock), and special substrates such as polypropylene. Available in both sheet-fed and web-fed models, many modern digital presses can emulate Pantone spot colors, print in up to seven colours in one pass, and some even contain embedded spectrophotometers and air-assisted feeding systems.

UV coats, and other coatings such as aqueous coatings are used to speed manufacturing of the cards. Cards that are not dry will "offset", i.e., the ink from the front of one card will mark up back of the next one. UV coatings are generally highly glossy but are more likely to fingerprint, while aqueous coatings are not noticeable but increase the life of the card. It is possible to use a dull aqueous coating on uncoated stock and get some very durable uncoated cards, and using UV coating or plastic lamination can also be applied to thicken thin stocked cards and make them more durable as well.

When cards are designed, they are given bleeds if color extends to the edge of the finished cut size. (A bleed is the extension of printed lines or colors beyond the line where the paper it is printed on will be cut.) This is to help ensure that the paper will cut without white edges due to very small differences in where the blade cuts the cards, and it is almost impossible to cut the cards properly without. Just being a hair off can result in white lines, and the blade itself will pull the paper while cutting. The image on the paper can also shift from page to page which is called a bounce, which is generally off by a hairline on an offset press, but can be quite large on lower end equipment such as a copier or a duplicator press. Bleeds are typically an extra 3.175 (1/8) to 6.35 mm (1/4 in) to all sides of the card.

(US)

- Bleed size: 95.25 × 57.15 mm (3.75 × 2.25 in) (1/8 in bleeds)
- Standard cut size: 89 × 51 mm (3.5 × 2 in)

(UK)

- Bleed size: 91 × 61 mm (3.58 × 2.40 in)
- Standard cut size: 85 × 55 mm (3.35 × 2.17 in)

Fold-over or "tent" cards, and side fold cards are popular as well. Generally these cards will fold to the standard size.

Cards can also be printed with a different language on each side.

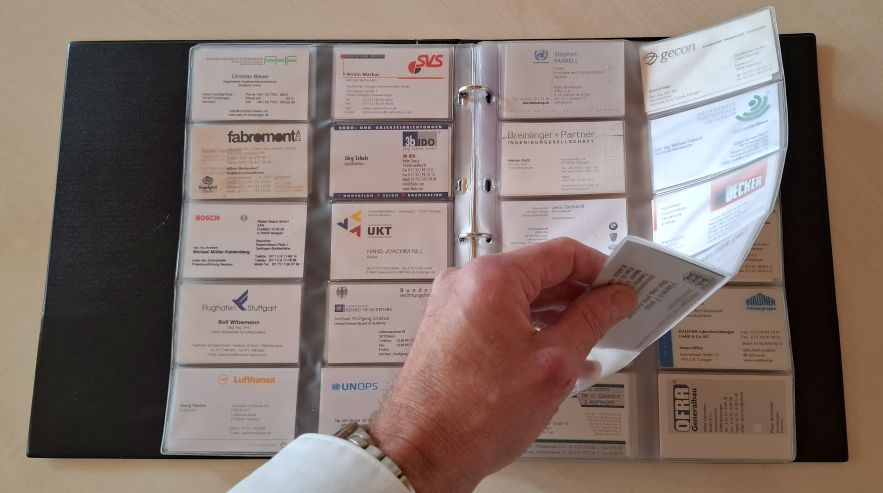
A collection of business cards

== Dimensions ==
Aspect ratios range from 1.42 to 1.8. There is no standard for the business card dimensions. Sharing dimensions with other types of cards makes storage easier, for example payment cards (85.60 × 53.98 mm) and business cards in Western Europe (85 × 55 mm) have almost the same size.

Country/Standard	Dimensions (mm)	Dimensions (in)	Aspect ratio
ISO 216, A8 sized	74 × 52	2.913 × 2.047	1.423
ISO 216, C8 sized	81 × 57	3.189 × 2.244	1.421
Austria, Belgium, France, Germany, Ireland, Italy, Nepal, Netherlands, Portugal, Spain, Switzerland, Slovenia, Turkey, United Kingdom	85 × 55	3.346 × 2.165	1.545
ISO/IEC 7810 ID-1, credit card sized, Australia	85.60 × 53.98	3.370 × 2.125	1.586
Australia, Colombia, Denmark, India, New Zealand, Norway, Taiwan, Sweden, Vietnam	90 × 55	3.54 × 2.165	1.636
Japan	91 × 55	3.582 × 2.165	1.655
China, Hong Kong, Malaysia, Singapore	90 × 54	3.543 × 2.125	1.667
Canada, United States	88.9 × 50.8	3.5 × 2	1.75
Iran	85 x 48	3.346 × 1.889	1.771
Argentina, Brazil, Bosnia and Herzegovina, Bulgaria, Costa Rica, Czech Republic, Croatia, Estonia, Finland, Hungary, India, Israel, Kazakhstan, Latvia, Lithuania, Mexico, Montenegro, Poland, Romania, Russia, Serbia, Slovakia, Sri Lanka, South Africa, South Korea, Ukraine, Uzbekistan	90 × 50	3.543 × 1.968	1.8
ISO 216, B8 sized	88 × 62	3.465 × 2.441	1.419

== Global variations ==
=== Japan ===

A Japanese business card is called a meishi (名刺). It typically features the company name at the top in the largest print, followed by the job title and then the name of the individual. This information is written in Japanese characters on one side and often Latin characters on the reverse. Other important contact information is usually provided, such as business address, phone number and fax number. Meishi may also contain a QR code to provide contact details in a machine-readable form, but this has not yet become a widespread practice. According to a 2007 survey, fewer than 3% of Japanese people own a meishi with a QR code printed on it.

The presentation of one's meishi to another person is more formal and ritualistic than in the Western world. The card should be held at the top two corners, face up and turned so that it can be read by the person receiving the meishi, who takes it by the bottom two corners using both hands. Placing one's fingers over the name or other information is considered rude. Upon receiving the meishi, one is expected to read the card over, noting the person's name and rank. One should then thank the other person, saying "choudai itashimasu" ("I accept your name card") or "choudai shimasu", and then bow. When meishi are being exchanged between parties with different status, such as between the president of a company and someone in middle management, it is proper that the person of lower status extend his or her business card in such a way that it is underneath or below the meishi being extended by the person in a higher position.

Meishi should be kept in a smart leather case where they will not become warm or worn, which are both considered a sign of disrespect or thoughtlessness. A received meishi should not be written on or placed in a pocket; it is considered proper to file the meishi at the rear of the leather case. If the meishi is being presented at a table, the recipient keeps the meishi on top of the leather case until they leave the table. If several people are involved in the meeting and one receives several meishi, the one with the highest rank is kept on the leather case, and the others beside it, on the table.

The manner in which the recipient treats the presenter's meishi is indicative of how the recipient will treat the presenter. Actions such as folding the card in half, or placing the presenter's meishi in one's back pocket, are regarded as insults.

Japanese executives or officials usually have two meishi: one in Japanese and intended for fellow Japanese, using the Japanese ordering of names (family name first), and another intended for foreigners, with the name in Western order (family name last).

== Other formats ==
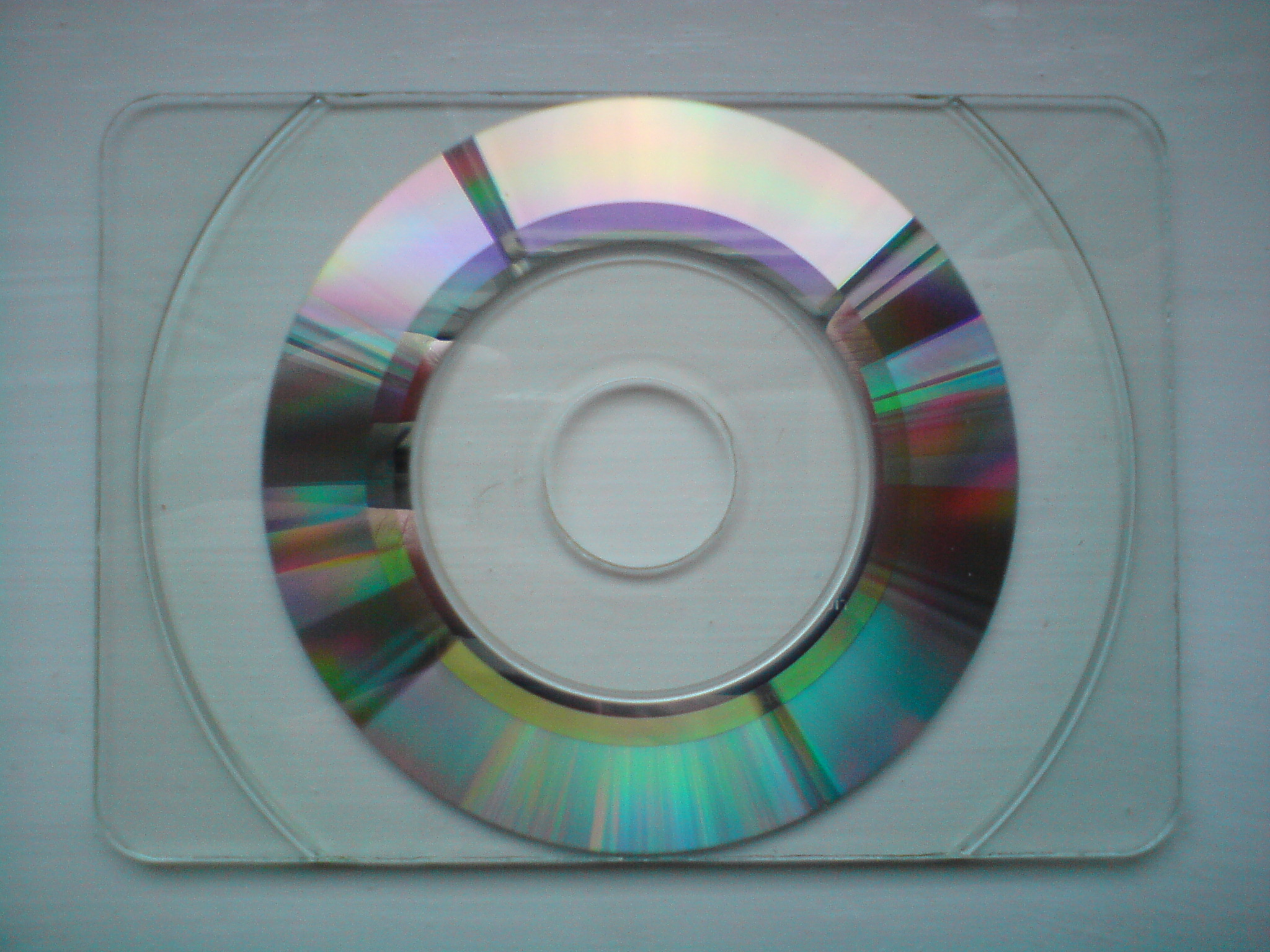
Business card size CD

Various technological advances made Compact Disc "business cards" possible, which could hold about 35 to 100 MB of data. These business card CDs may be square, round or oblong but are approximately the same size as a conventional business card. CD business cards are designed to fit within the 80 mm tray of a computer's CD-ROM drive. They are playable in most tray computer CD drives, but do not work in slot-loading drives. Despite the ability to include dynamic presentations and a great deal of data, these discs were never in common use as business cards, though they are still available.

With handheld computers and smartphones becoming more ubiquitous, business card data is increasingly exchanged electronically via direct wireless connections (e.g. infrared, Bluetooth, RFID), SMS, specialized apps (e.g. Bump) or via a cloud service (e.g. licobo). Once again, however, these new methods of transmitting business information have yet to completely replace the traditional physical business card.

== Special materials ==
Apart from common business cards made of paper/card there are also special business cards made from plastic (PVC), especially frosted translucent plastic, crystal clear plastic, white or metallic plastic. Other unusual materials include metal, rubberized cards, rubber, magnets, poker chips, wooden nickels and real wood. For the most part, these special material business cards are of standard format, sometimes with rounded corners.

== Business card software ==
Business cards can be mass-produced by a printshop or printed at home using business card software. Such software typically contains design, layout tools, and text editing tools for designing one's business cards. Most business card software integrates with other software (like mail clients or address books) to eliminate the need of entering contact data manually. Cards are usually printed on business card stock or saved in an electronic form and sent to a printshop. Multiple programs are available for users of Linux, macOS and Windows platforms.

== Web-to-print ==
In addition to business card software, many printing firms now offer a web-to-print service, which allows the customer to choose from a selection of stock design templates, customize online using their own logos and imagery, select quantities, view pricing options and request them for delivery to home or business addresses. Often this process is applied not only to business cards, but also to letterheads, notepads, labels and compliments slips.

== Collecting ==
There are several hundred known collectors of business cards, especially antique cards, celebrity cards, or cards made of unusual materials. One of the major business card collectors' clubs is the International Business Card Collectors, IBCC. IBCC members exchange cards with other members, simply for the price of postage.

== For dating ==
See Visiting_card#For_dating.

== See also ==
- Carte de visite
- Comp card
- hCard
- vCard
- Visiting card
- Digital business card
