= Friedheim =

Friedheim may refer to:

- Arthur Friedheim (1859–1932), Russia-born composer
- Friedheim Award, an annual award given for instrumental music composition
- Friedheim, Missouri, U.S.
- Friedheim International Ltd., British supplier of finishing, converting and packaging machinery
- The German name of Miasteczko Krajeńskie, a village in Greater Poland Voivodeship, Poland
