= Contraves Cora =

Digital fire-control system

Cora
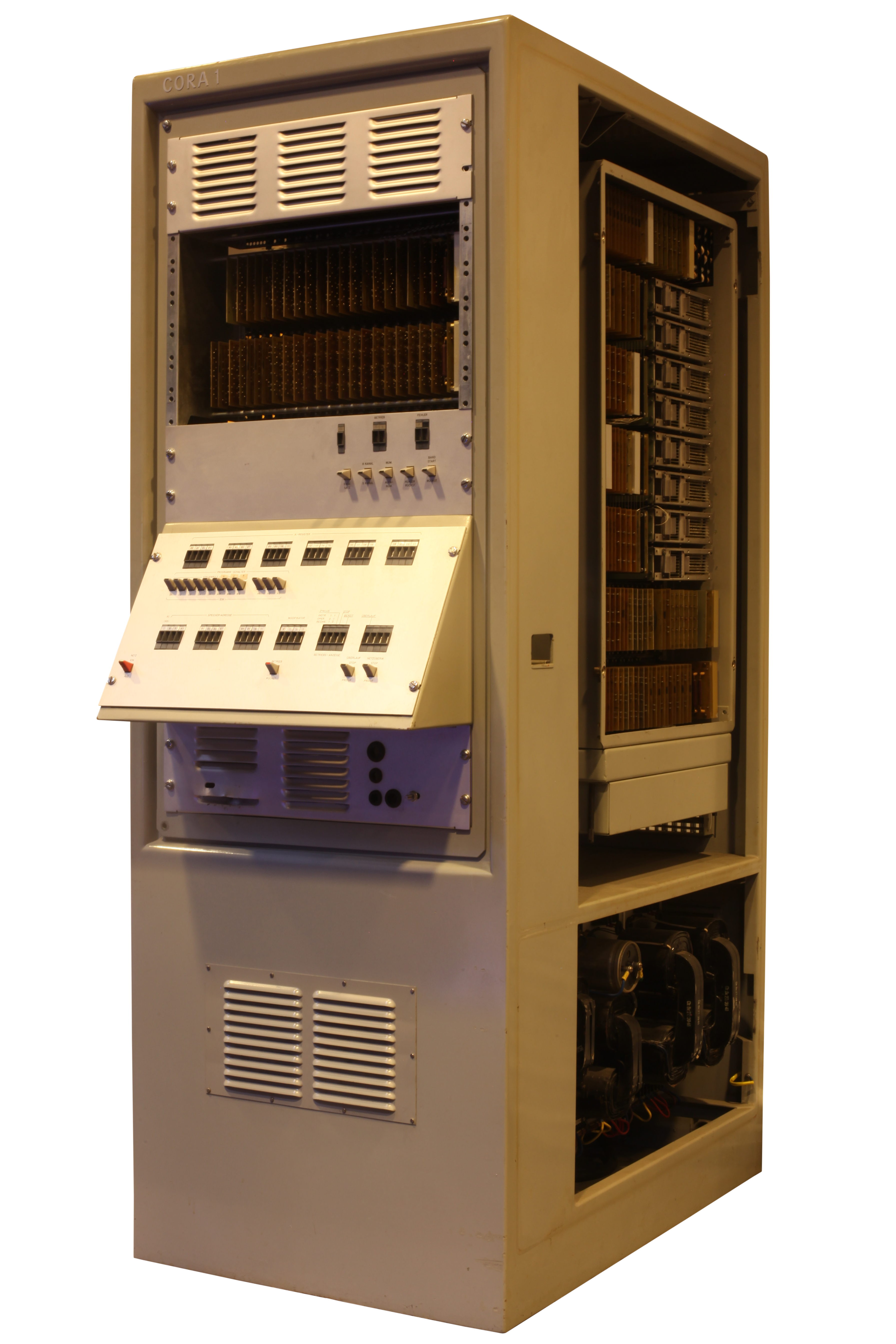
- Cora-1
- Manufacturer: Contraves
- Type: Fire-control system
- Released: 1963

The Cora was a digital fire-control system designed by Hungarian-Swiss Peter Tóth and produced by the Swiss company Contraves.

== Development ==
Peter Tóth started the design of Cora-1 in 1957. The system was intended for anti-aircraft fire direction with the Swiss Army. However, Cora-1 turned out to be too slow and too bulky for this application. It was programmed for other applications by programmers including Heinz Lienhard. One copy of the system was used at the École Polytechnique Fédérale de Lausanne (EPFL) for cartography, and was put on display during Expo 64. The unit was rediscovered in storage in 2011, and is now on display at the Musée Bolo, in the Computer Science department of the EPFL. Cora-1-was one of the first fully transistorized digital computers built in Switzerland according to the Von Neumann architecture.

An improved version of this computer was developed subsequently by a team led by Swiss engineer Peter Blum. Cora-2 was successfully used for anti-aircraft fire direction being compact enough to fit into the corresponding mobile control unit.

The Musée Bolo met with Peter Tóth and released several videos around his work on the Cora.
