= Compliments =

Compliments may refer to:

- "Compliments" (Band of Horses song)
- "Compliments" (Bloc Party song)
- Garcia, an album by Jerry Garcia that is also known as Compliments
- Compliments, a private label brand of groceries sold by Sobeys

== See also ==
- Compliments slip
