= Musée Bolo =

Museum in Lausanne, Switzerland

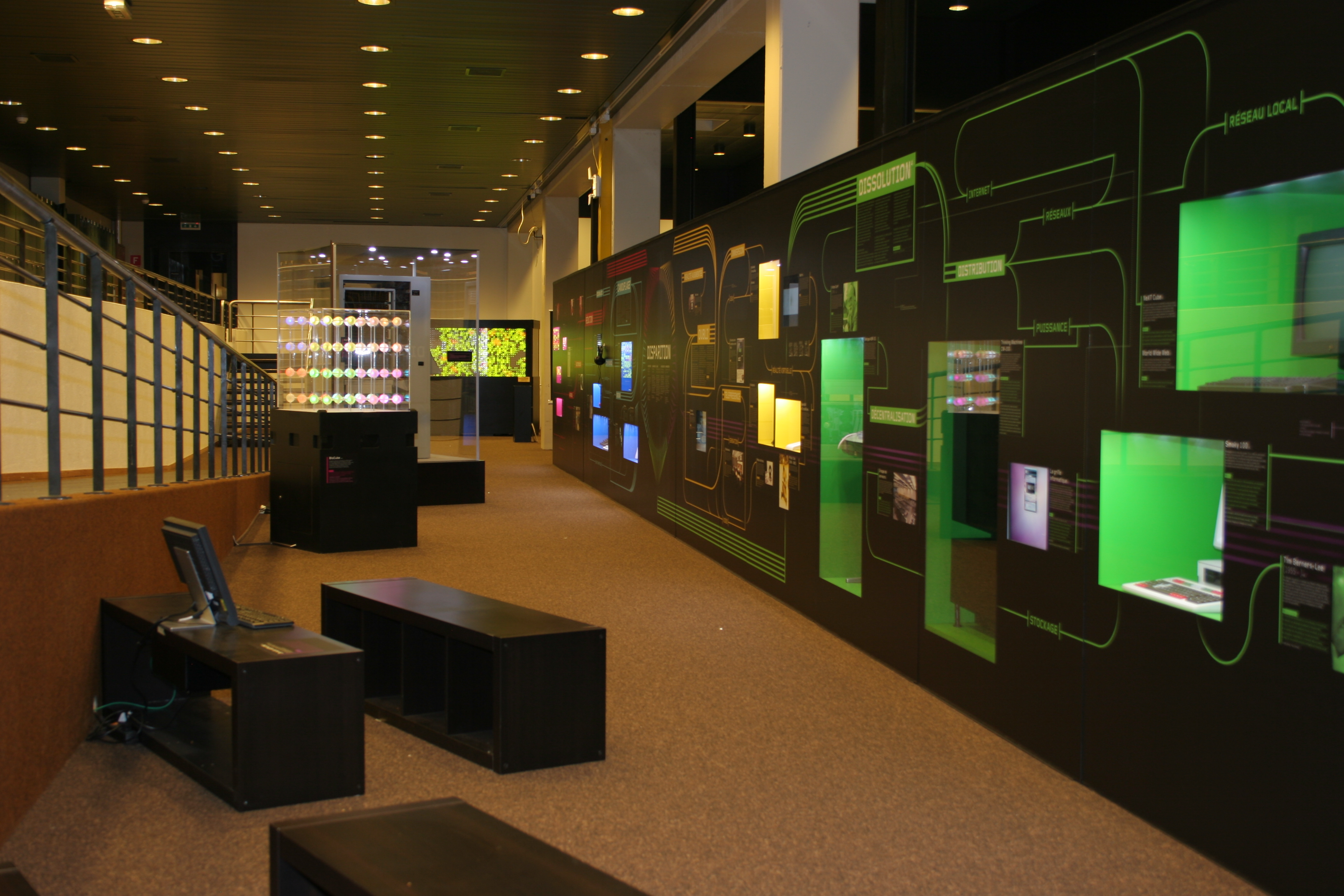

- Location within Switzerland
- Established: 2002; 24 years ago
- Location: EPFL - Bâtiment Inf, Station 14, 1015 Lausanne
- Coordinates: 46.51870°N 6.56377°E
- Collection size: Computer equipment
- Public transit access: Lausanne Metro
- Website: www.museebolo.ch

The Musée Bolo or Swiss Museum of Computer Science, Digital Culture and Video Games is a private museum dedicated to the digital revolution. Its exhibition space is located on the site of the École Polytechnique Fédérale de Lausanne (EPFL) in Lausanne, Vaud, Switzerland. Its main storage area is located near Lausanne Train Station.

== Collections ==
Within the museum is a collection of old computers dating from the 1960s to the 1990s in danger of disappearance. This is named Bolo's Computer Museum (BCM), and opened in June 2002. Besides old computers, this collection includes other items associated with old computers, such as peripheral devices, hardware documentation and related books and magazines. Among them is the Contraves Cora anti-aircraft fire control computer.

On 10 November 2011, BCM opened its permanent exhibit, titled "Programmed disappearance", which includes the rarest objects of its collection. Its theme is the various ways in which computers, through trends such as miniaturization or cloud computing, tend to blend into the background of everyday life and become both pervasive and invisible.

Examples of computers on display
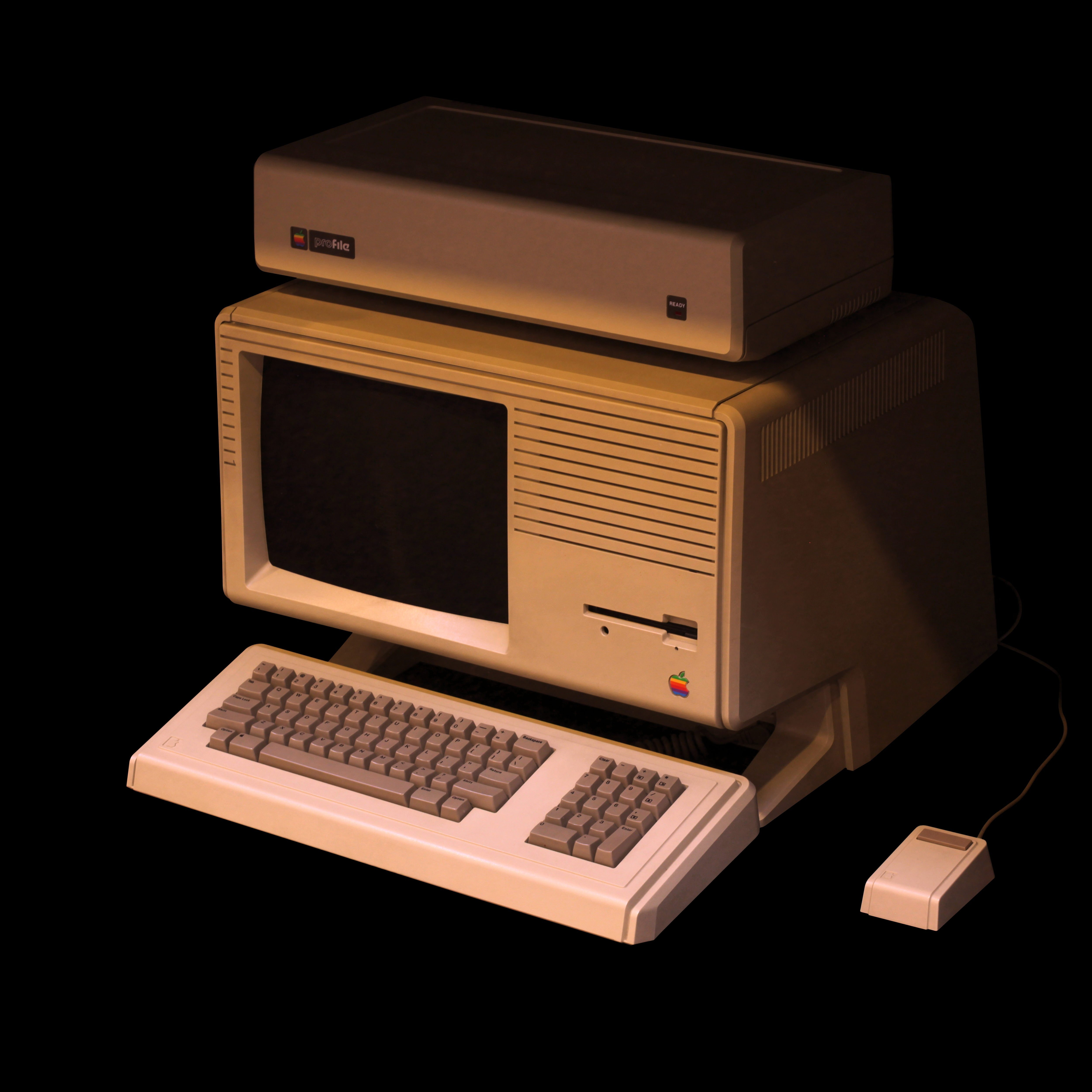
Apple Lisa, with an Apple ProFile external hard disk sitting atop it

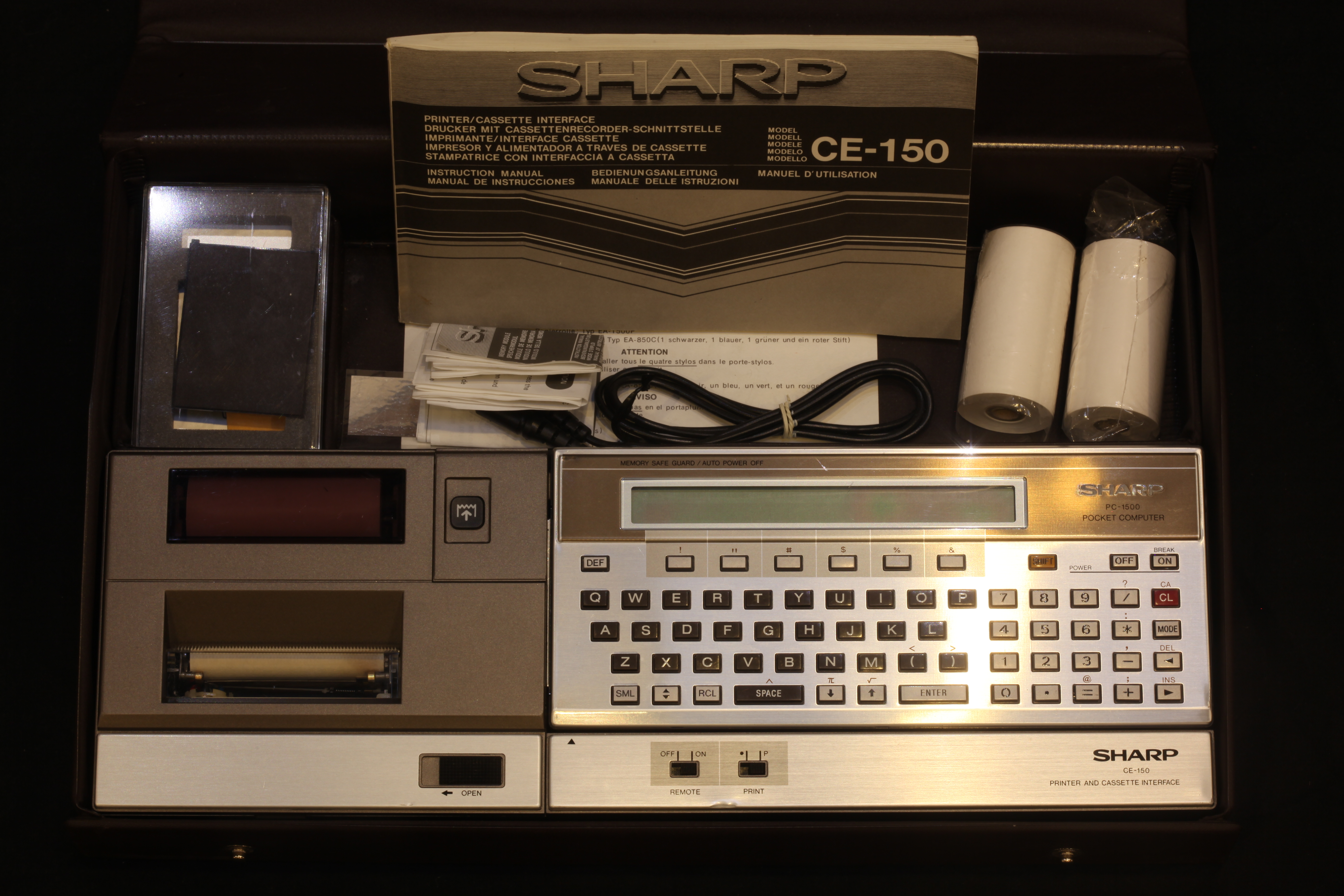
The Sharp PC-1500 with printer/plotter and cassette interface in travel case

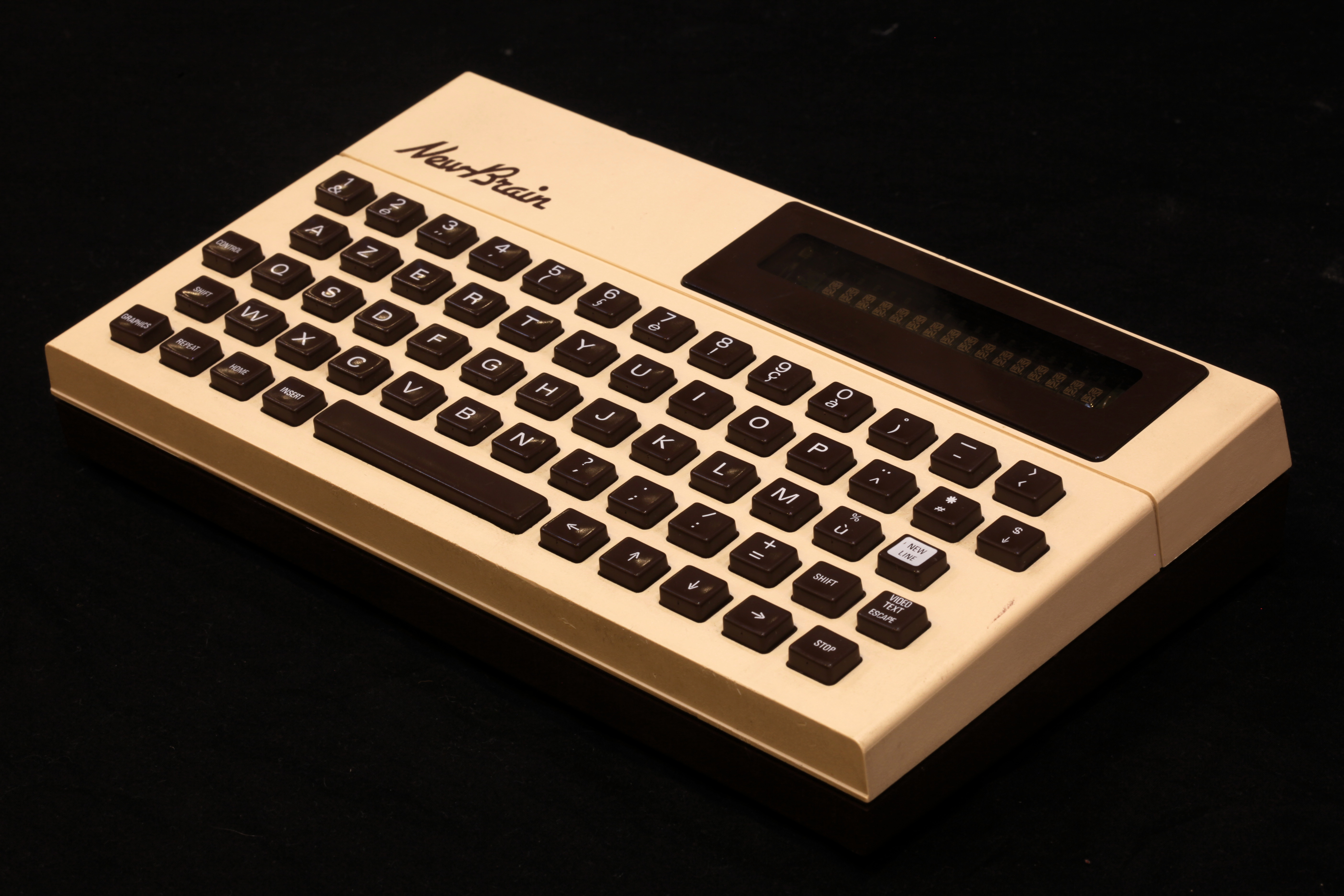
GBS Newbrain AD with a French keyboard

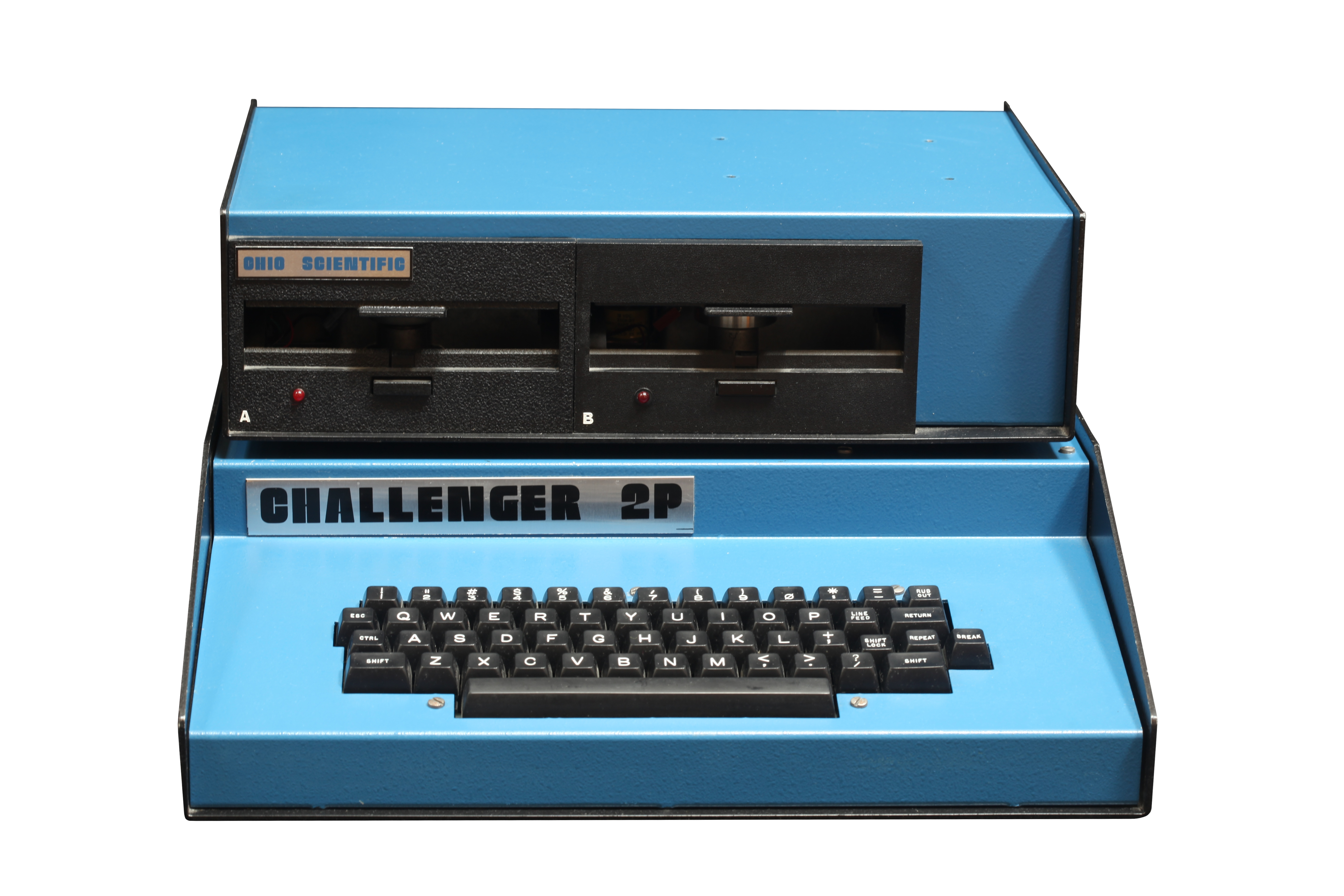
Ohio Scientific Challenger 2P, with optional double disk unit

In 2017, Logitech put a number of rare or iconic items on display

Examples of pieces provided by Logitech
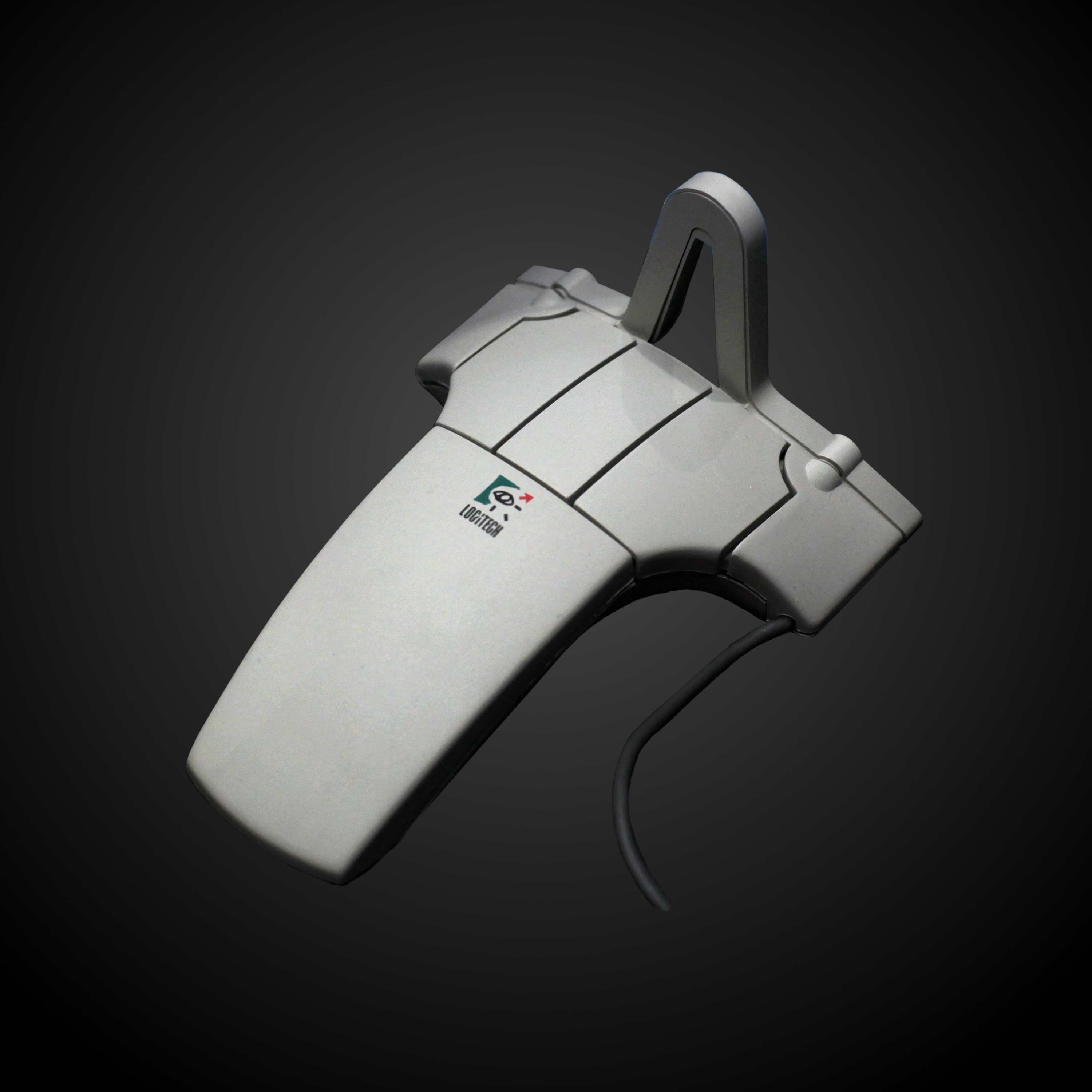
Logitech 3D mouse (1990)

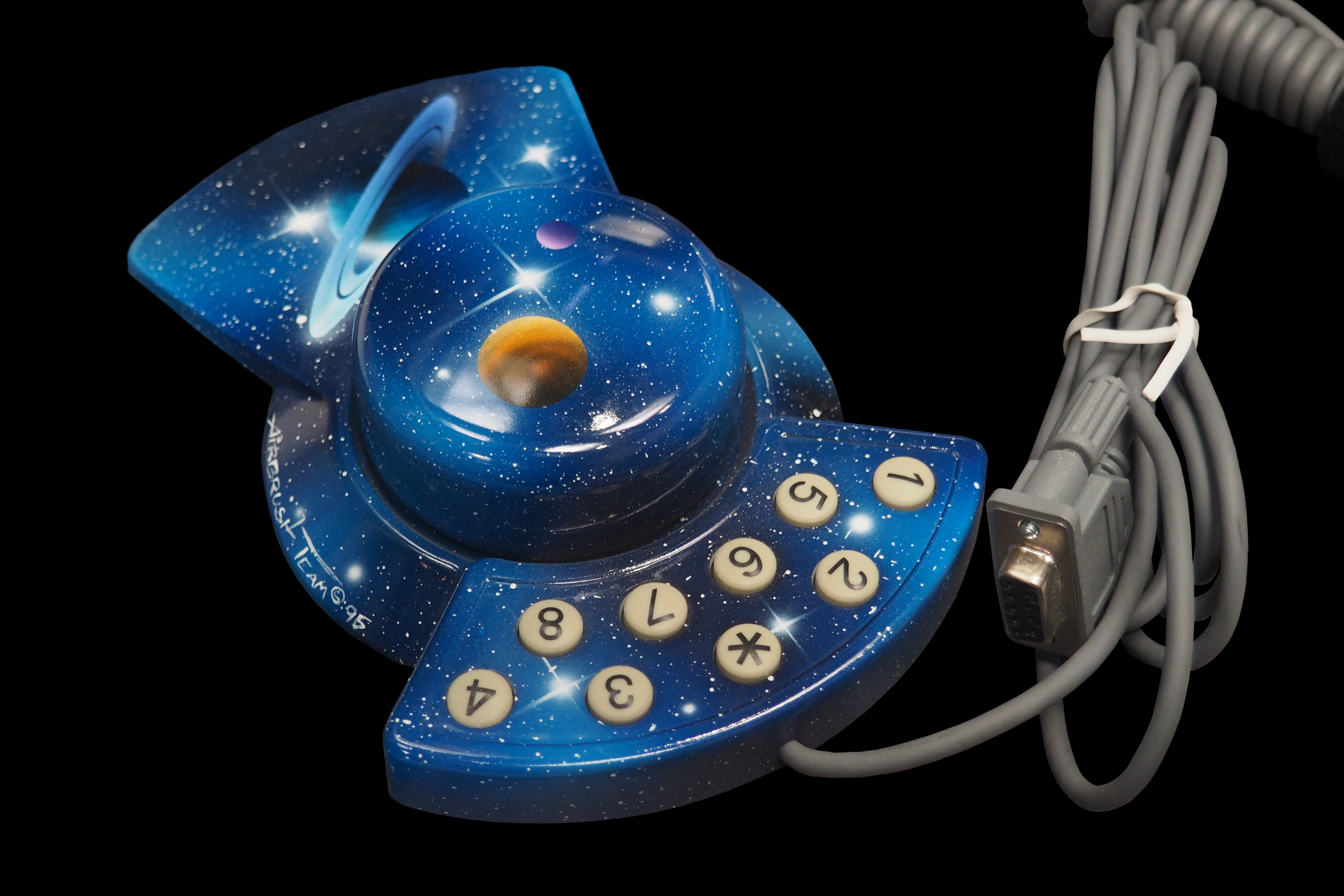
Logitech Magellan

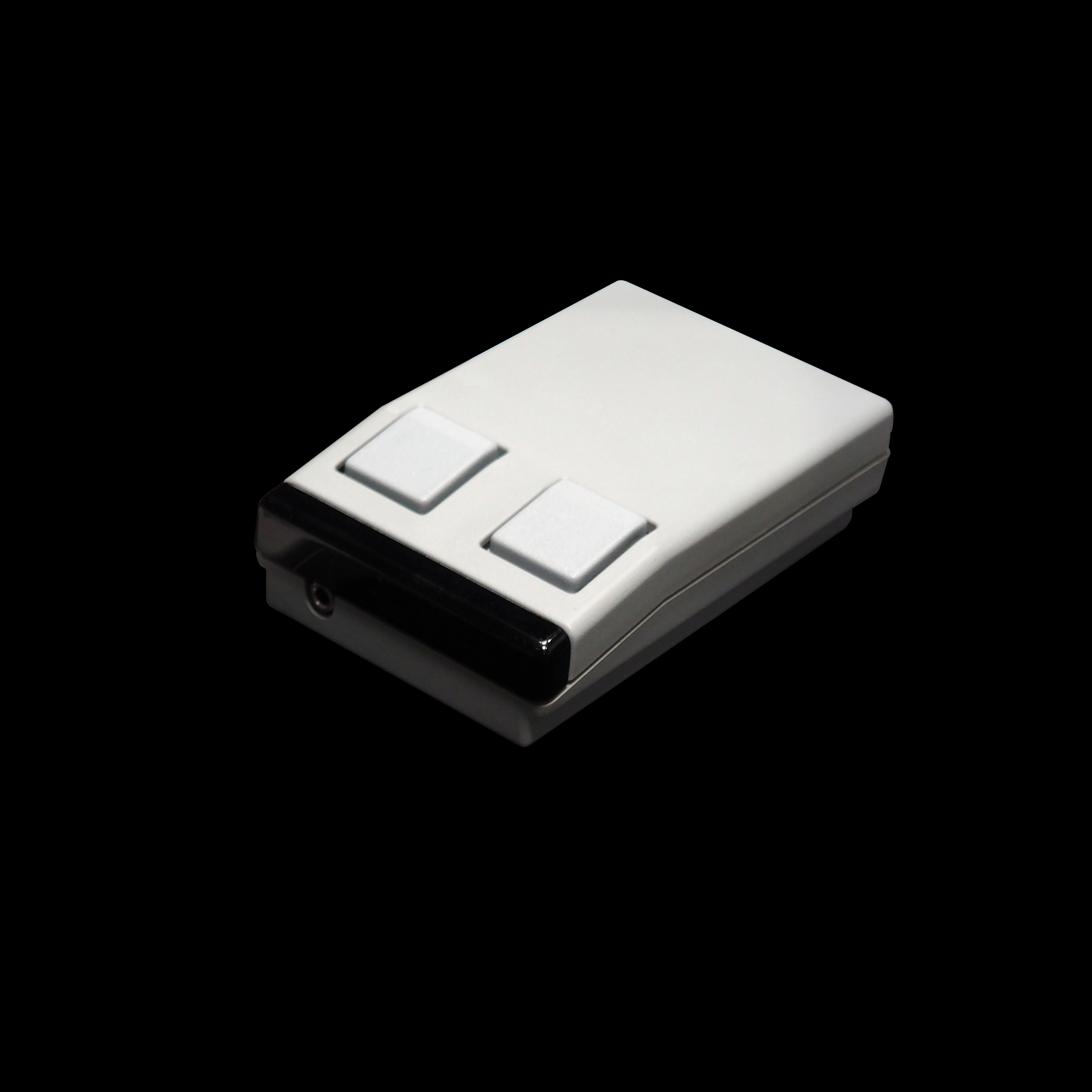
Logitech Metaphor, the first wireless mouse (1984)

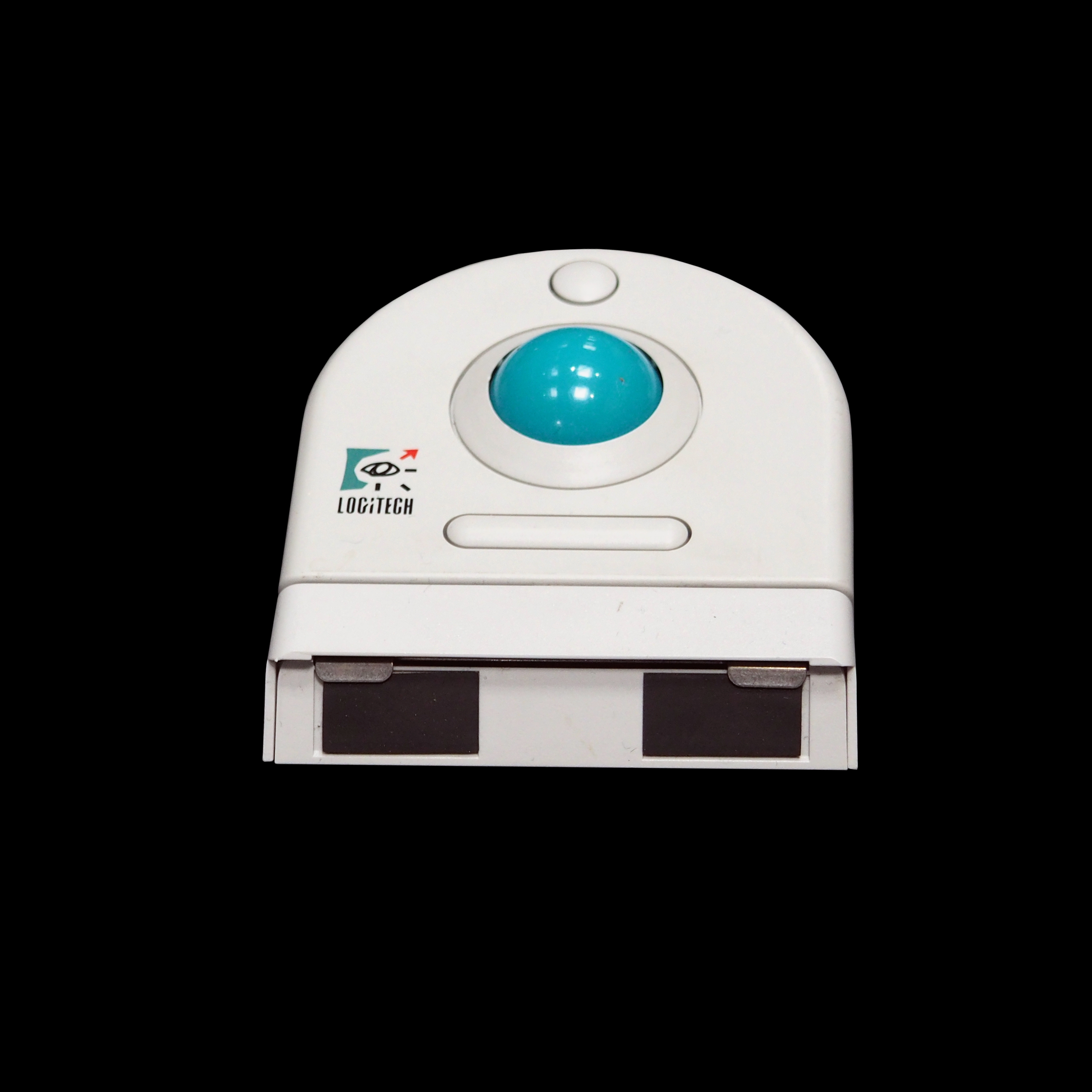
Logitech Trackman Portable

== See also ==
- Lausanne campus
- List of museums in Switzerland
