= Heinz Lienhard =

Swiss electrical engineer and inventor (1937–2020)

Heinz Lienhard (18 June 1937 – 12 May 2020) was a Swiss electrical engineer and an inventor. He was inventor of current measuring equipment and developer of the programming language PORTAL.

== Life ==
Heinz Lienhard graduated in electrical engineering at the Federal Institute of Technology, Zurich (ETH Zurich) in 1961. He started his professional career at Contraves-Oerlikon, a Swiss weapons manufacturer. There, a digital computer had been developed. Lienhard joined this company to write programs for the computer, called CORA 1. Then, he moved to the US to work for AMPEX in Redwood City, California, where he did research on magnetic thin-film memories. Simultaneously, he studied statistics at Stanford University, where he obtained a Master of Science degree. After moving back to Switzerland, he joined Landis+Gyr, a Swiss company based in Zug. With his team at the central laboratories he developed metering equipment for electric utilities and debit cards for phone companies based on holography, called Phonocards.

Starting in 1974, he conceived a new programming language based on Pascal. Together with his colleague Rudolf Schild, he optimized Pascal for real-time applications and multi-processor systems. Their resulting language was called Process-Oriented Real-Time Algorithmic Language (Portal). Together with the École Polytechnique Fédérale de Lausanne, an application for the Bobst Group was implemented.

In 1993, Lienhard founded the company Ivyteam AG in Zug. Ivyteam was specialized to model business processes.
