= Digital business card =

Alternative to paper business cards

A digital business card is an electronic version of the traditional paper business card. It is essentially a digital profile that contains contact information and other relevant details. These cards can be shared electronically, often through QR codes, links, or NFC tags.

== Environmental benefits ==
Every year, over 7 billion business cards are printed worldwide. This equates to 27 million cards being printed each day. The production of these cards requires 12,000 tonnes of paper annually. The short lifespan of business cards contributes significantly to waste, as many are thrown away after a single use, ending up in landfills. Digital business cards offer a sustainable alternative by eliminating the need for physical cards, reducing the environmental impact of business card production and disposal.

== Market ==
The digital business card market is poised for significant expansion, according to a new report by Market Research Future (MRFR). The market is expected to reach a value of USD 6 billion by 2030, growing at a compound annual growth rate (CAGR) of 6.90% during the forecast period (2022–2030).

== Benefits ==
Digital business cards offer a host of advantages over their traditional counterparts:

- Eco-friendly: Digital business cards eliminate paper waste and reduce environmental impact.
- Easy to update: Contact details can be changed instantly.
- Enhanced networking: Easily shared and accessed, improving networking efficiency.
- Interactive features: Can include multimedia elements like videos, links, and social media profiles.
- Analytics: Can provide valuable insights into how a card is being accessed and shared.
- Integration with other tools: Compatible with CRM, marketing platforms, and other business tools.

== See also ==
- VCard
