= Bobst (company) =

Swiss machinery and services company

Bobst Group SA
- Type: Limited Company Société Anonyme
- Traded as: ISIN: CH0012684657
- Industry: Packaging and labeling
- Founded: 1890
- Founder: Joseph Bobst
- Headquarters: Mex, Switzerland
- Area served: Worldwide
- Key people: Jean-Pascal Bobst
- Products: Equipment and services for packaging manufacturers
- Revenue: ▲CHF 1.960 billion (2023)
- Net income: ▲CHF 147.2 million (2023)
- Total assets: JBF Finance SA...
- Number of employees: 6,363 (2023)
- Website: www.bobst.com

Bobst is a Swiss company that supplies machinery and services to the packaging industry. Products include machines for the manufacture of packaging and its derivatives (such as labels, bags, and adhesive strips) from solid board, corrugated board or flexible materials (plastic films, etc.). The headquarters of the organization is in Mex, near Lausanne, Switzerland.

== History ==
Founded in 1890 by Joseph Bobst in Lausanne, Switzerland, BOBST has a presence in more than 50 countries, runs 14 production facilities in 8 countries and employs close to 5,400 people around the world. The firm recorded a consolidated turnover of CHF 1.563 billion for 2021.

The company was established to supply commercial printers in Lausanne. The trademark ‘Bobst’ was filed in 1917 and was followed by the formation of a limited company with the name J. Bobst & Fils SA in 1918.

In 1936 the company opened its first sales office outside of Switzerland, in Paris, France. In 1938, J. Bobst & Fils SA moved to a new industrial production site in Prilly, a suburb of Lausanne. The Autoplaten die-cutter was invented by the company in 1940. In 1965, J. Bobst & Fils SA acquired the Champlain company of Roseland, New Jersey, which is now called Bobst North America Inc. In the same year Bobst Italiana was created, this subsidiary now being called Bobst Italia SpA. Nihon Bobst KK was established in 1970 and now has the name Bobst Japan Ltd. The Group established a presence in Latin America in 1974 with the creation of Bobst Brazil, now called Bobst Latinoamérica do Sul Ltda. An additional production site at Mex, near Lausanne, was established in 1977.

The name of the company was changed to Bobst SA in 1978 and in the same year it was introduced to the Lausanne Stock Exchange.

In July 2017, Bobst created a new startup located in Switzerland called Mouvent. This 100 employee company is responsible for the design, integration and production of inkjet printing engines or clusters, chemicals, pre-coating, varnish, inks and software.

== Foreign offices ==
Bobst Canada was created in 1979 and in 1980 a factory was opened in Maua, Brazil. In 1985 Bobst SA made two foreign acquisitions - Martin, a company with premises in Villeurbanne and Bron, both near Lyon, France, and Peters Maschinenfabrik GmbH of Hamburg, Germany. In 1987 Bobst Group Italia took a stake in Schiavi SpA, a company with production facilities in Piacenza and Modena, Italy, first established in 1927. Bobst Group Benelux (now Bobst Benelux NV) was established in 1989 and Bobst Group Deutschland (now Bobst Meerbusch GmbH) was established in 1990.

Bobst Group Africa & Middle East (now Bobst Africa & Middle East Ltd) was opened in Tunisia in 1992. In 1993 Bobst SA acquired Asitrade AG of Grenchen, Switzerland and also established Bobst Group Central Europe (now Bobst Central Europe s.r.o.) in the Czech Republic. Bobst Group Taiwan and Bobst Group Malaysia (now Bobst Malaysia Sdn. Bhd) were created in 1994, followed by the creation of Bobst India Pvt. Ltd and Bobst Indonesia (now PT. Bobst Jakarta) in 1995 and Bobst Group Thailand (now Bobst Thailand Ltd) in 1996.

In 1997 two new factories were opened, one in Itatiba, Brazil and the other in Shanghai, China. In the same year Bobst Group Latinoamérica Norte was established in Mexico (now Bobst Latinoamerica Norte SA de CV). In 1998 The Corrugating Roll Corporation of Rutledge, Tennessee was acquired and Bobst Group Vostok (now Bobst CIS LLC) was created in Moscow, Russia. Bobst Group Polska (now Bobst Polska Sp. zoo) was established in Poland in 1999.

In 2000 a partnership agreement was signed with the BHS Group of Weiherhammer (Germany). In the same year Bobst acquired Fairfield Enterprises PLC of Redditch (UK, established 1884 as Oscar Friedheim), a leading supplier of finishing, converting and packaging machinery, paying 200p per share. Fairfields activities concerning the distribution of Bobst machinery in the UK and Ireland were renamed ″Bobst UK Holdings Ltd″. The remaining parts of Fairfield, Friedheim International and Lasercomb Group, were sold to their management in 2005 and 2006 respectively. Also in 2000 Bobst Group Scandinavia (now Bobst Scandinavia ApS) was created in Denmark.

2001 saw a legal restructuring of the group with all holdings subsequently managed by Bobst Group SA. In the same year the Shanghai, China and Itatiba, Brazil plants were enlarged. In 2002 a factory was built in Pune (India) and a representative office opened in Kyiv, Ukraine. In 2003 the site at Bron, Lyon was expanded and Bobst Group Ventas y Servicios España (now Bobst Ibérica, S.L.) was established in Barcelona, Spain. A series of acquisitions were made in 2004 which included the Atlas, General, Midi, Rotomec and Titan brands as well as a majority shareholding in Steuer GmbH Printing Technology of Leinfelden, Germany. In 2006 the companies Rotomec SpA, Schiavi SpA and Bobst Italia SpA were merged and took the name Bobst Group Italia SpA (now Bobst Italia SpA). Fischer & Krecke GmbH based in Bielefeld, Germany was acquired in 2008.

In 2009, Bobst Group companies FAG, located in Avenches, Switzerland, and Rapidex, located in Angers, France, were closed. Bobst Group SA appointed a new CEO, Jean-Pascal Bobst, on May 7, 2009, and the group began a transformation program. A structure by Business Unit and the concept of lean production were introduced in 2010. In the same year a project was started to consolidate all the operations of Bobst SA on the Mex, Switzerland site and to sell the company's land and buildings at Prilly. Bobst Group company Atlas Converting Equipment Ltd of Bedford, UK, was sold to its management. In 2011 Bobst Group acquired 65% of the shares in Gordon Ltd of Hong Kong. In 2012, General was renamed Bobst Manchester Ltd.

In 2012, the Group's historically grown brand portfolio was consolidated under a single brand: BOBST.

The official opening of the consolidated site at Mex, Switzerland, took place in 2013. In 2014, Bobst partnered with Kodak to develop new products.

In 2014, Bobst Group's consolidated sales amounted to SFr 1.30 billion. The company has eleven production sites in eight countries and employs around 5000 people across fifty countries. Bobst Group is listed on the Swiss stock exchange SIX Swiss Exchange.

In 2015 Bobst acquired Nuova Gidue Srl, a manufacturer of inline flexo presses and multi-process printing and converting lines for the labels and flexible packaging industries, based near Florence, Italy. The company is renamed Bobst Firenze Srl. Bobst also acquired full ownership of Gordon Ltd.

== Corporate structure ==
The Bobst organization is organized around three business divisions:

- Sheet-fed is aimed at professionals in the folding box and corrugated board industries.
- Web-fed offers printing and converting equipment from reels in the fields of soft materials and folding box and labels.
- Services is aimed at professionals in the packaging industry and provides customer service for the operation of Bobst equipment.
