= At Home day =

Social custom in Victorian Britain

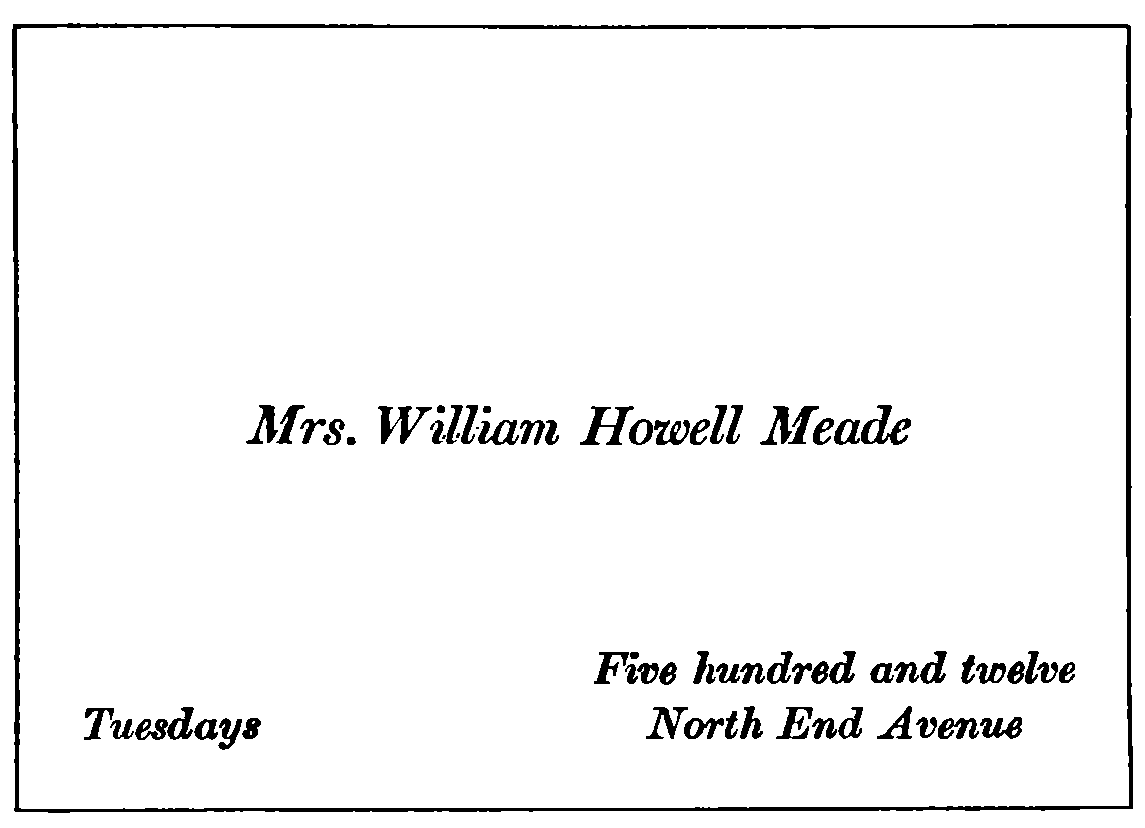
Sample lady's visiting card from 1910, specifying an At Home day

The "At Home" day was a social custom in Victorian Britain, where women of gentle status would receive visitors on a specific day of the week.

The woman would print calling cards indicating she would be "At Home" e.g. on "Fridays in April". Those of her acquaintances who had received the card could then call on her that day. Guests should visit between three or four and six in the afternoon, and stay for a period from a quarter of an hour to an hour, depending on the level of intimacy with the hostess.

== British colonies ==
The custom of "At Home" days was also observed in the British colonies, such as in Wellington, New Zealand. Here the tradition served to uphold barriers between the different social classes among the colonists.

== Decline ==
The invention and proliferation of the telephone—facilitating the planning of visits on a shorter notice—did much to make away with the convention of "At Home" days.

It was made further obsolete when, in World War I, many women immersed themselves in the war effort; and, in doing so, largely ignored many previously held social obligations.

A further consequence of the war was that economic scarcity made domestic servants less common, a trend that made the old calling system impractical.

== Literary examples ==
Suffragist Evelyn Sharp used the term in her 1897 short story "The Other Anna", where the heroine liberates herself by turning her back on the "At Home" day:

The next day was Sunday and her At Home day; and she came to the conclusion that her circle of friends was a very dull one, and that no one who was a bit nice ever called on her At Home day, and that the only interesting people were the people who never called at one at all, the people, in fact, whom one met in odd ways without any introduction; and at this point of her reflections she laughed unaccountably, and resolved to give up her At Home day.

It is also mentioned in George Bernard Shaw's 1913 play Pygmalion, where it is held by the mother of the protagonist Henry Higgins:

MRS. HIGGINS [dismayed] Henry! [scolding him] What are you doing here to-day? It is my at home day: you promised not to come.

In Edith Nesbit's 1899 novel The Story of the Treasure Seekers, the phenomenon of the "At Home" day is used to express social differences:

You know the people next door are very grand. They won't know us--and they go out in a real private carriage sometimes. And they have an 'At Home' day, and people come in cabs. I daresay they have piles of plate and jewellery and rich brocades, and furs of price and things like that. Let us keep watch to-night.

== See also ==
- Office hours
