= Fairfield Enterprises =

British-based manufacturer of industrial belting

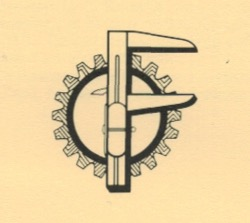
- Former logo of Oscar Friedheim Ltd
- Company type: Privately held company
- Industry: Distributor
- Predecessor: Oscar Friedheim Ltd
- Founded: 1884
- Defunct: 2000
- Fate: Acquired
- Successor: Bobst AG
- Headquarters: Redditch, England, UK
- Key people: James Ramsey Venn (Chairman) (1999); Geoffrey Crossland Darricotte (Chief Executive) (1999)
- Revenue: £ 57.8 million (1999)
- Operating income: £ 2.9 million (1999)
- Number of employees: 353 (1999)

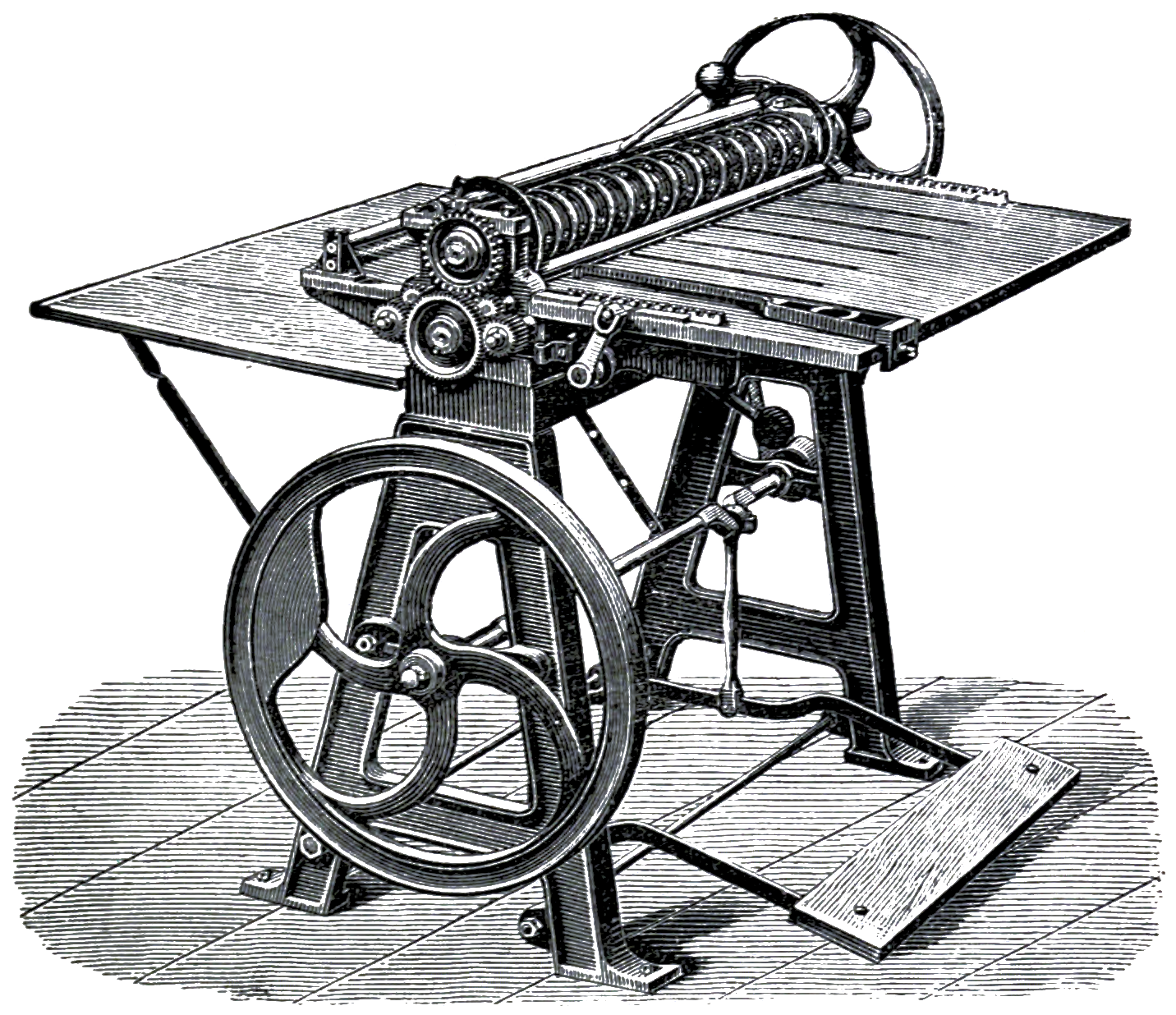
German made card cutting and scoring machine for the production of visiting cards imported by Oscar Friedheim

Fairfiel Enterprises was a leading British-based machine distributor and supplier of tooling and support services to the printing and packaging industries. The company was taken over in 2000 by the Swiss company Bobst AG, a supplier of machinery and services to the packaging industry.

== History ==
The business was founded in London in 1884 by the Jewish-German immigrant Oscar Friedheim (1858–1928), at first trading in the supply of cardboard and paper. Five years later the company turned to the import and distribution of machinery, starting with a German made card cutting and scoring machine for the production of visiting cards. From there on Oscar Friedheim focused on building up its connections with overseas machine manufacturers in the paper and packaging industry (e. g. Bobst, Faber & Schleicher, Muller Martini and after the Second World War Winkler + Dünnebier).

In 1913 the company was incorporated as a limited company with a nominal capital of £17,000. After the death of the companies founder on 17th May 1928 his wife Henriette Friedheim (née Braun, 1868–1935) took over as the governing director of Friedheim.

During The Blitz its head office in Water Lane was hit hard twice. Most of the machinery and the company records got destroyed. Therefor a new provisional office had to be set up at Mill Hill. 1948 Oscar Friedheim Ltd. bought the engineers and sundries business of John Haddon & Co, a London-based printing and advertising company.

In 1970 Fairfield Enterprises Ltd. was created as a holding company of Oscar Friedheim Ltd. To extend its business into spare parts Fairfield bought 50% of Lasercomb Dies Ltd. (Redditch) in 1984 and purchased the remaining 50% in 1991.

In August 1997 Fairfield was listed on the London Stock Exchange at 80p per share to raise funds for acquisitions and to "allow shareholders who are descendants of Oscar Friedheim, ..., to realise a value for their holdings." In 1998 Fairfield bought Palatine Engraving (Leeds) and Kennedy Grinding (London). In 1999 the headquarters of Fairfield Enterprises was moved from London to Redditch.

In 2000 Bobst AG of Switzerland acquired Fairfield Enterprises, paying 200p per Share. Fairfield's activities concerning the distribution of Bobst machinery in the UK and Ireland were renamed Bobst UK Holdings Ltd. The remaining parts of Fairfield, Friedheim International and Lasercomb Group (including Palatine Engraving), were sold to their management in 2005 and 2006 respectively.
