= Compliments slip =

Small acknowledgement note, less formal than a letter

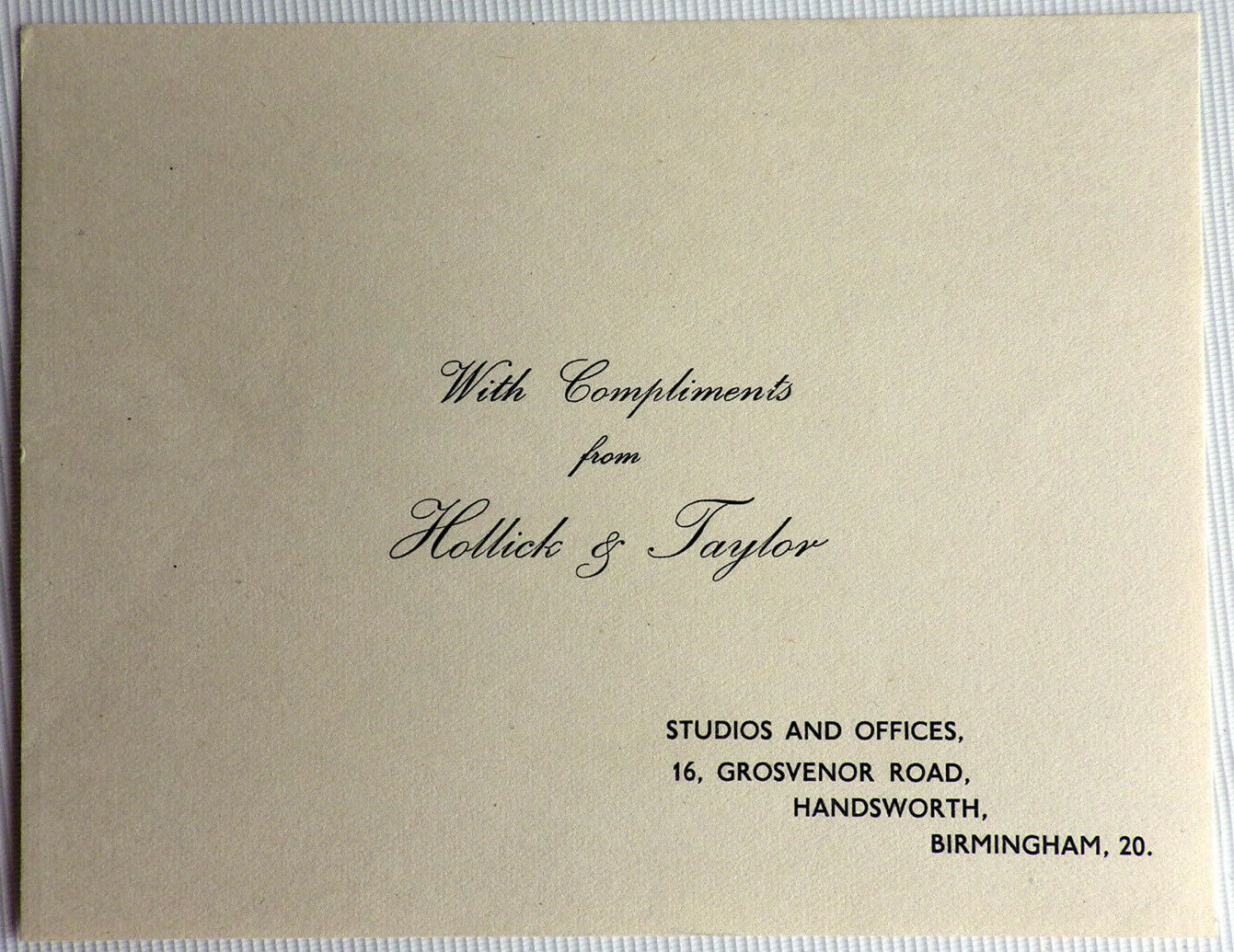
Example of compliments slip, 1951

A compliments slip (or with compliments slip) is a slip of paper that contains the same name and address information that would be on a letterhead of formal letter stationery, the pre-printed salutation "with compliments" or "with our/my compliments", and space afterwards for a short handwritten message to be added. It is used in correspondence, as an enclosure for other material.

Compliments slips, which are informal, can sometimes substitute for more formal letters of reply. For example, the response to a request for a product catalogue or a price list may simply be the price list or catalogue, with a compliments slip attached, rather than with a formal letter of reply. The inclusion of compliments slips in responses to such routine requests is often seen by businesses as a necessary step in maintaining good public relations.

There is no fixed size for compliments slips. They may vary in size from the size of a business or visiting card, from which compliments slips originally evolved, to the size of a whole sheet of letter writing paper. Eric Bain recommends that they be of a size suitable for placing inside an envelope without more than one fold, and large enough to be noticed when included in a parcel. (Standard letter stationery outside the U.S. often requires folding twice in order to be placed inside envelopes.) To this end he recommends that compliments slips be size A6 paper. Miller recommends size A5 for stationery that doubles up as both compliments slip and headed letter paper.

Since they are informal, compliments slips are not substitutes in those cases where a formal letter is required for legal reasons. In building contract work, for example, a drawing or a copy letter sent to a contractor with a compliments slip attached is not a formal instruction to perform the work on the drawing or letter. It is at most an invitation to perform that work, at no charge to the employer. A valid instruction would be a formal letter of instruction, or an instruction provided on a printed "Architect's Instruction" form (signed by the architect).

Falconer states that a compliments slip should never be sent instead of a personal letter, and that it is better to send a personal letter in response to a customer enquiry, because it provides a personal touch. Hailey recommends an alternative strategy for providing a personal touch: removing the salutation from compliments slips, thus forcing the entire note to be hand-written.
