= Coffee Hag albums =

Early 20th century stamp books

The Coffee Hag albums were published in the early 20th century by the Kaffee Handelsgesellschaft AG (Kaffee HAG, Coffee Hag) in Bremen, Germany, starting with heraldic stamps and collector's albums.

The stamps and books were the initiative of the Die Brücke association. This was an initiative of Emperor Wilhelm II to make an archive of published material. At the same time the association developed standard sizes for publishing material. To promote their activities and their new standards, they encouraged companies to publish material in their standards. The Kaffee Hag company was one of the companies that agreed to do so. Hence the stamps are published in the so-called Weltformat V der Brücke (or 4 × 5.66 cm), which is also printed on the back of the stamps. The albums were published in the Weltformat IX (16 × 22.6 cm). Only on the German and Swiss stamps was there the reference to the Weltformat.

The association went bankrupt in 1913 and was abolished in 1914, but the size of the stamps remained the same for all the albums.

The company hired the famous artist Otto Hupp to design the stamps. Otto Hupp already had published several well-known volumes on German civic heraldry since the 1890s.

The albums became a success in Germany and the company exported the idea to the other European countries in which the company operated.

== The albums ==
Two series, Germany and Switzerland, were started before World War I and were never finished. In the 1920s and 1930s the second series of these countries as well as the other countries were launched. In each country different heraldic artists were used to write the albums and draw the images.

In the 1920s the series were again published in Switzerland and Germany, followed by other countries. The following albums were published:

- Germany 1st series: 6 albums, plus a series of stamps for Silesia, but no album Silezia
- Switzerland old series: 4 albums
- Germany new series: 10 albums, the 11th album (German-Austria) was planned, but not issued
- Switzerland new series : 19 albums, with multiple reprints. More than 60 albums are known
- Netherlands: 2 albums, loose sheets with multiple storage options
- Belgium: 6 albums, 3 Dutch and 3 French albums (identical)
- Poland: 1 album, 2nd album planned, but not issued
- Danzig: 1 album
- Norway: 1 album and one reprint
- Sweden: 1 album
- Denmark: 1 album
- Yugoslavia: 1 album - also contains rare stamps from pre-WWII Croatia, Serbia and Slovenia
- Austria: 1 album, with additional luxury edition
- Czechoslovakia: 1 album, with additional luxury edition
- England/Ireland: 1 album
- France (as Café Sanka): 6 albums (of 40 planned)

In total around 125 different albums were published between 1914 and 1955. Albums for the Baltic states, Italy as well as a second album for Poland and an 11th for Germany were planned, but never issued. The French series stopped after 6 albums of the planned 40. More than 12500 different stamps were issued, making it the largest heraldic publication of the 20th century.

The image stamps were collected using coupons in the coffee packages, not only from Hag, but sometimes in packages of other companies as well. The stamps were issued in sheets, but the sizes of the sheets as well as the distribution was organised differently in each country.

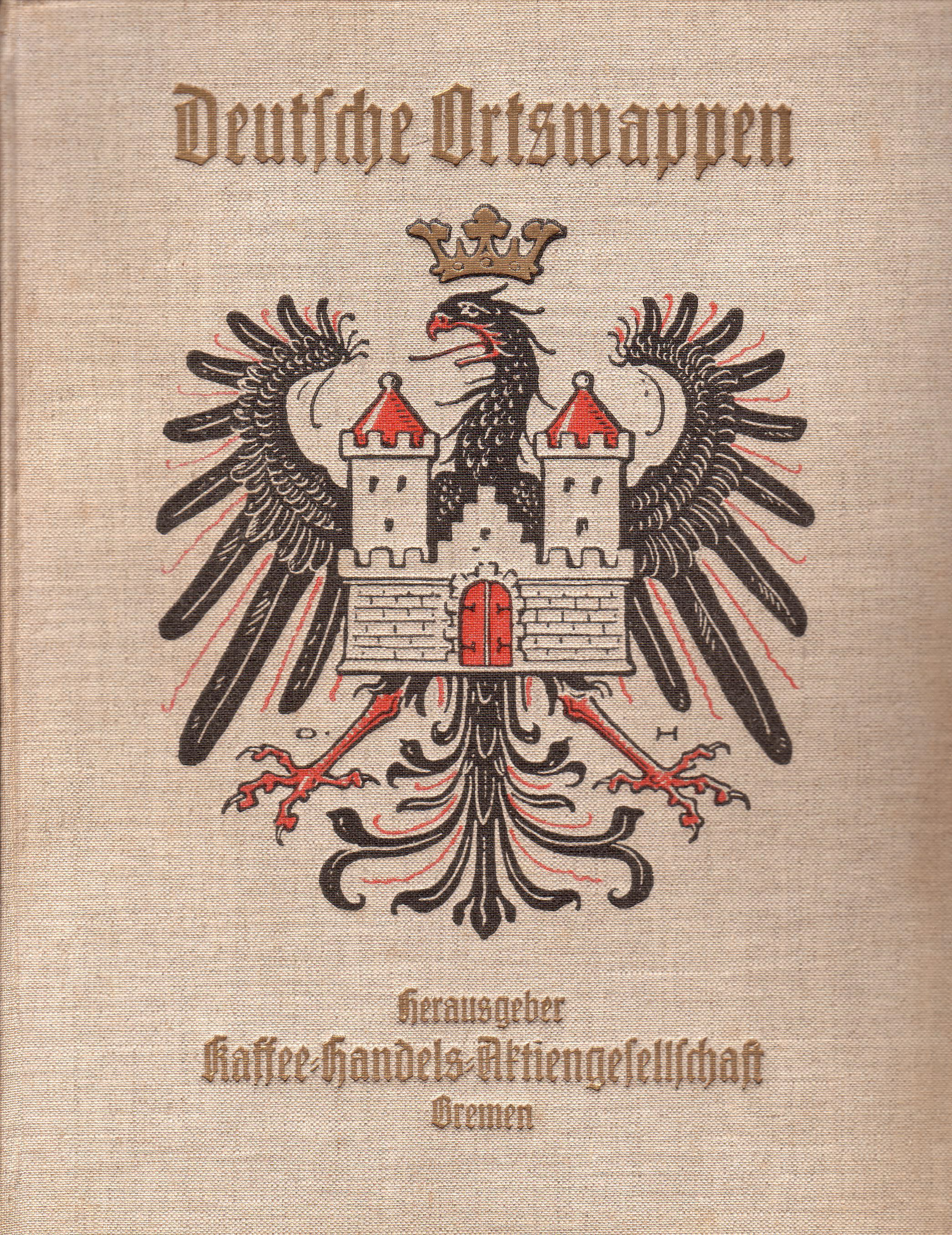
Title page German luxury edition

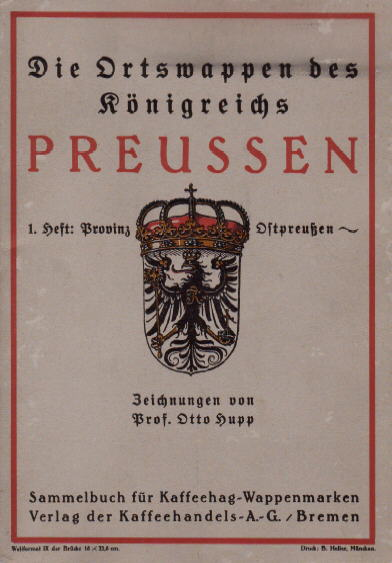
Title page German old series, album 1, 1st edition

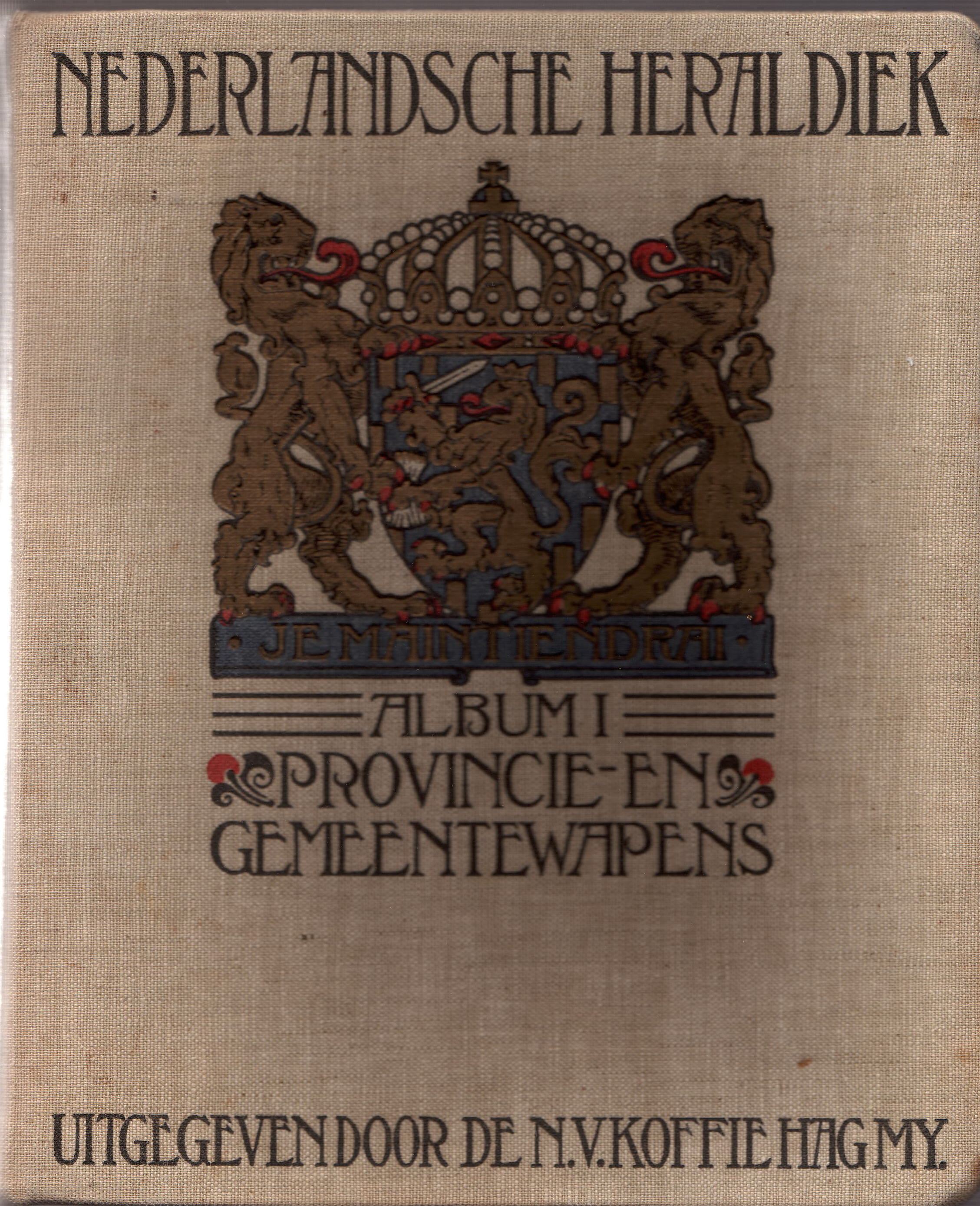
Title page Dutch album

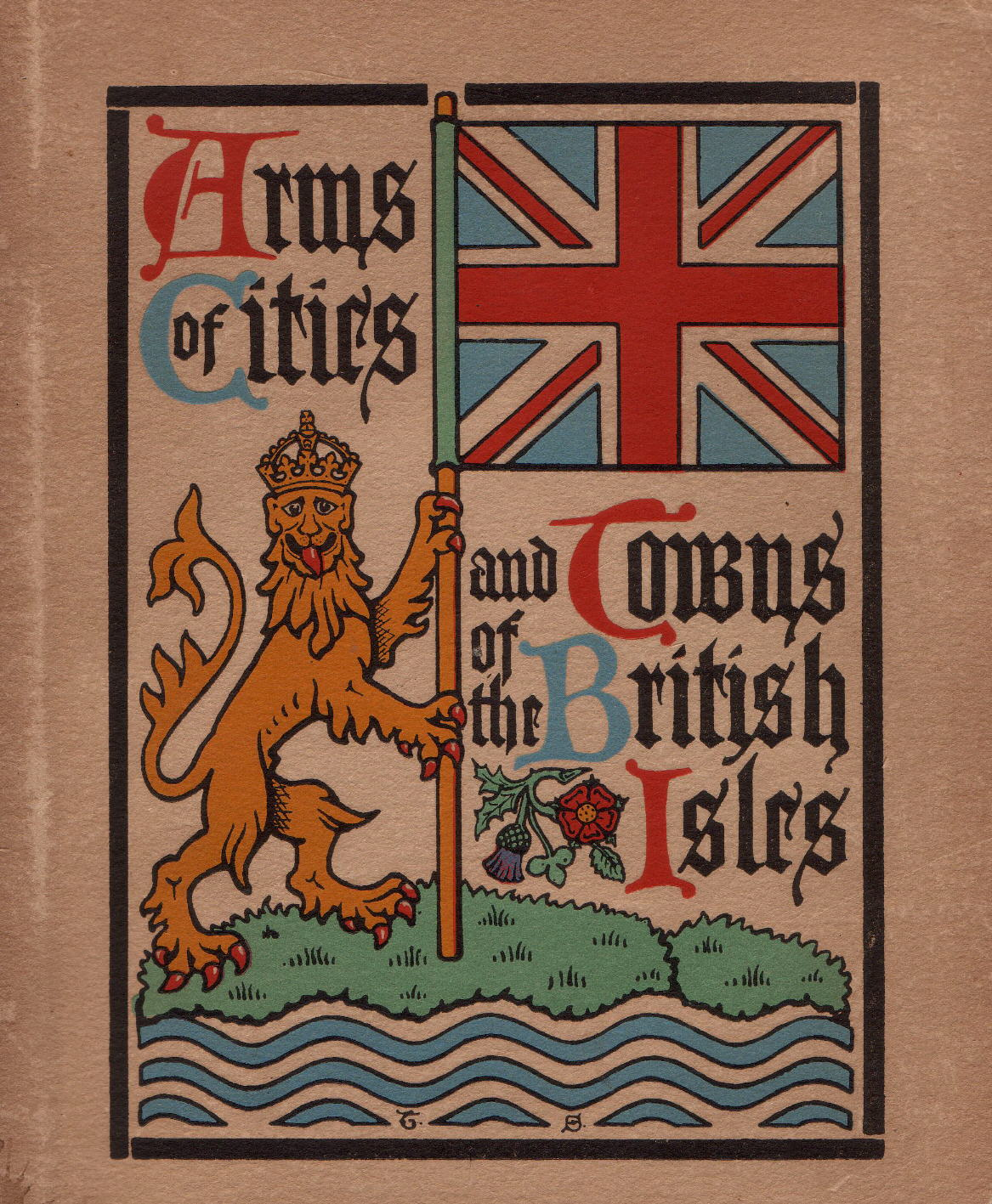
Title page British album

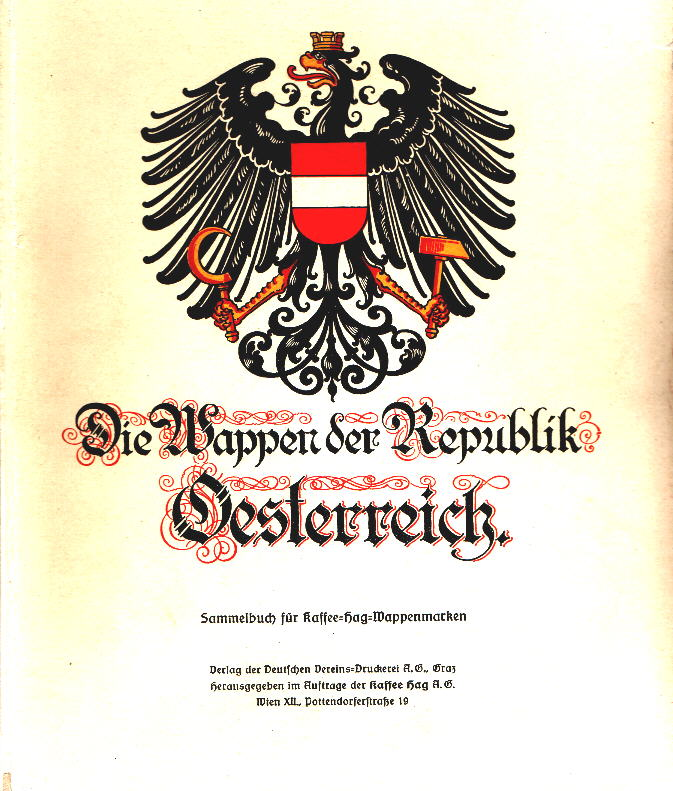
Title page Austrian album

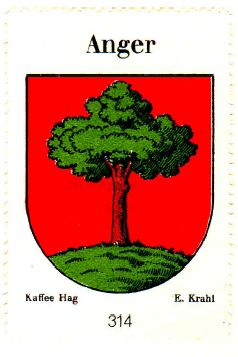
Austrian image

== Belgium and Luxembourg ==
The Belgian Coffee Hag albums are unique, as they are issued in two languages, Dutch ("Wapens van het Koninkrijk België en het Groothertogdom Luxemburg") and French ("Armorial du Royaume de Belgique en du Grand Duché de Luxembourg"). The series of Switzerland and Czechoslovakia are also issued in two languages, but the albums themselves are bilingual; for Belgium two separate series in either language were issued. Each series consisted of three small albums, with loose sheets. Per sheet 9 arms were shown, with the description and some background on the back of the sheet.

The albums were printed by M. Weissenbruch NV in Brussels. The images and texts were made in the studio of Van der Laars in the Netherlands. The same studio also made the images and texts for the Dutch albums. The images were of the same size as the images of the other countries (4x5.5 cm).

The stamps are numbered by province and issued arbitrarily, not alphabetically as in most other countries. This system is identical to the Dutch albums. The albums were issued from 1931 onwards. The series were not issued completely by province, but the sheets were issued in batches consisting of parts of multiple provinces. The sheets and stamps were reprinted approximately halfway completion. This has resulted in two different editions of the series, as the second edition has a slightly different lay-out and many errors were corrected. The main texts are identical. For both languages two editions exist.

The Dutch and French texts are near-identical for the arms and descriptions. The main difference is in the (short) additional text, which was issued after the Luxembourg province pages. Unlike the albums from most other countries, the Belgian albums have no separate chapters or texts on coffee, the company or the health effects of coffee.

In addition the albums also contained a 17-page introduction to heraldry, with numerous examples from the Belgian towns. These were referred to by their numbers. The second edition has the same text, but the numbers and examples have been updated with the newer stamps. The date on both texts, however, is February 1930. The text was written by Fidèle-Gabriel, a priest who also illustrated the book on the heraldry of Belgian provinces (issued in 1919 Dutch and in 1921 in French and written by E. Gevaert).

The number of official stamps is 782, including variations 902.

== Danzig ==
The album was issued in 1930 by Kaffee Hag, Danzig. Author was Dr. Hubertus Schwarz, a senator for the city council of Danzig. However, there are reasons to suspect that F. W. Burau is the real designer of the images.

The book contains 125 arms, and besides the arms of the city and towns in the territory of the Free City of Danzig, it also contains images of personal arms, house marks, the seals of the city of Danzig and flags. As the territory of Danzig was very small, these additions were necessary for a complete album. Several later additions were planned, and some space was left for these in the album, but these were never issued.

== Germany ==
The German issue is the largest series. The oldest series were titled 'Die Deutschen Ortswappen', but this title did not appear on the albums itself. The series consisted of the following albums:

- Die Wappen des Königreichs Preußen, Provinz Ostpreußen (3 reprints)
- idem, Provinz Westpreußen (2 reprints)
- idem, Provinz Brandenburg (1 reprint)
- Die Wappen des Königreichs Bayern, Ober-und Niederbayern (1 reprint)
- Die Wappen des Königreichs Preußen, Provinz Pommern
- idem, Provinz Posen

The 7th album for Silezia was never issued, the stamps were partially issued.

The old series consisted of 703 images and some variations

Author was Prof. Otto Hupp.

The new (second) series was published as Deutsche Ortswappen (Neue Reihe) between 1927 and 1938. There are several differences as compared with the old series issued between 1913 and 1918.

The albums were issued as loose sheets, which could be bound in either 10 small albums, or in four large albums. Each page contained 9 arms. The content of the 10 albums was described, still people often filled the albums at random or by state, which means that each album may contain different pages.

The four large albums were not numbered and could be used at will.

The arms were published by province/state, but the images of the different provinces were not issued at the same time, some parts were issued years after the first half of the series.

The official number of images was 2811, but including variations around 3010 stamps are known.

== Denmark ==
The book was issued by Kaffe Hag a/s in Copenhagen. It is not sure when it was issued. Due to the similar text in the back of the album as in the Norwegian album, it is most likely published around the same time in the early 1930s. In a brochure for the German albums from 1935 it is mentioned that the book on Denmark was already published. It was printed at the Nordlundes Bogtrykkeri in Copenhagen. The author is also not known, although Poul Bredo Grandjean has been mentioned as author. Poul Bredo Grandjean published two other heraldic books between 1920 and 1940 and was considered the most esteemed heraldist of the country in those days.

The album contains only the arms of towns. The stamps were issued in 8 sheets of 18 stamps each, with an additional 5 stamps with advertising.

== France ==
The album series La France Héraldique has a complicated history. Initially the series were intended to be issued as loose sheets, to be bound in albums per region. Therefore, initially the album sheets with the arms and description of the region were issued. This was to be followed by one sheet with the nine most important cities of each province (département) within the region. However, this was not completed as such, only a limited number of provinces was actually published.. Finally per province all municipal arms were to be published. However, this scheme was never completed. There were 40 different albums planned, but only 6 were issued.

The first two albums were issued both as loose sheets as well as bound. In the first album only some provinces were displayed, but all the regional arms were included. Albums II-IV included the arms of the other regions and their provinces. Albums V and VI show all the municipal arms of the Alsace region, the first region in the alphabet.

The result of the change from loose sheets to albums is that the regional pages are duplicated, as are the arms of the principal cities in the two provinces of the Alsace Region (Bas-Rhin and Haut-Rhin). Of the 1363 images, 62 are duplicated.

The official number of images was 1363, but including variations around 2000 stamps are known.

== Britain ==
The album "Arms of cities and towns of the British Isles" was issued around 1930.

The British album was published in Westminster (London) by Abbey Press Ltd. The author is not known, but Major Thomas Shepard has often been mentioned as the author.

The album contains 236 stamps with images, which are numbered separately in each section. The album is divided in chapters per Region, with the Regional arms on a separate page, followed by, alphabetically, the other towns and cities in the Region. The Regions are: London, England, Scotland, Wales, Ireland and Northern Ireland. Besides the region, the stamps also mention the county in which the town is situated.

== Yugoslavia ==
The album "Grbovi Jugoslavije" was issued around 1930.

The album was published by Kava Hag, Zagreb and printed by Lit. Tipografija D.D. Zagreb. The authors were Emilij Laszowski and Rudolf Horvat.

The album contains 256 stamps with images, which are numbered without breaks from 1 (national arms) until 256 Žužemberg. The album is divided in 3 chapters; the first on the National and Royal arms, followed by some historical territorial arms. The second deals with provincial arms and the third (and largest) part with the town arms.

== Netherlands ==
The Dutch albums were issued in two series.

The first series was issued as "Nederlandsche Gemeentewapens" between 1925 and 1928. These series only showed the municipal arms in the Netherlands and the Netherlands East Indies (present Indonesia, but also including the arms of Surinam in South America). For the stamp-pages hardcover albums or a cardboard box were available. The cover showed the small National Arms. The side showed the text Nederlandsche Gemeentewapens, and the back advertising for the company. The total collection consisted of 1027 stamps and generally three hardcover albums were needed.

The second series were issued between 1931 and 1935 as Nederlandsche Heraldiek and showed the arms of new or changed municipal arms, new and changed arms in Netherlands East Indies, the arms of the water boards, the officially registered arms of Houses, Castles, Estates and similar, the arms of former municipalities and two series of personal arms. These personal arms were of important Dutch and foreign families and persons during the 80-years war of independence (1568–1648) of the Netherlands against Spain. The total number of arms issued was 841.

== Norway ==
The Norwegian album, "Norske By-og Adelsvåben", was issued by Kaffe Hag Aktieskelskap in Oslo in 1933. Author was Hallvard Trætteberg. Hallvard Trætteberg (1898–1987) was within the State Archives responsible for heraldry issues for several decades. He wrote numerous articles on heraldry, both personal as non-personal (civic and religious) heraldry in Norway.

The album is unique among the Scandinavian series, as it also contains the arms of Norwegian noble families, both historical and contemporary. It also contains a larger introduction to heraldry as compared to the other two albums. Like the Danish album it also contains a section on the production of coffee.

The stamps were issued in 8 sheets of 18 stamps each, with an additional 3 stamps with advertising on the last sheet.

== Austria ==
The album "Die Wappen der Republik Oesterreich" was issued around 1933 and published in Graz by the Verlag der Deutschen Vereins-Druckerei A.G. The author was F. Hasslinger.

Two different versions of the album were published; a small edition and a luxury edition. The luxury edition came in a cardboard cage and had one additional page with the Austrian National arms.

The album contains 450 (luxury) images, which are numbered from 1 to 449. The national arms has no number. The album is divided in chapters per State, with the State arms on a separate page, followed by the capital city and, alphabetically, the other towns and cities in the State. The exception is the State of Burgenland, from which no town arms were published.

== Poland ==
The Polish album, "Herbarz Polski", was issued in 1932 by Kawa Hag, Warsaw. The author was Dr. Marian Gumowski. Dr. Gumowski (1881–1974) was a historian from Toruń, a well-known heraldry expert.

The album is mentioned as part one (Zeszyt I). More issues were planned with personal arms, but never published. Part one contains 284 arms of towns, (historical) districts, dioceses etc., but no personal arms.

The arms were supplied in 8 sheets of 36 stamps each. Four of these were used for advertising. The back of the stamps contained no texts.

== Czechoslovakia ==
The album "Znaky Republiky Československé – Wappen der Tschechoslowakischen Republik" was issued around 1933.

The Czechoslovak album was published by Grafických Umĕlechkých Závodů v. Neubert a synové, Prague-Smíchov (Graphischen Kunstanstalten v. Neubert und Söhne, Prag-Smíchov). The authors were Vilém Klein (Wilhelm Klein) and Anton Morávek.

The whole album is written in both Czech and German. The album has been published in a simple and a luxury edition. The luxury edition has a hard-cover in colour and a cardboard case. The luxury edition also has 6 more pages with the regional arms. The album is published as Part 1, but a second part was never published.

The album contains 180 stamps with images, which are numbered separately in each section. The album is divided in chapters per Region, with the Regional arms on a separate page, followed by again the Regional arms, the regional capital and, alphabetically, the other towns and cities in the Region. The Regions are: Bohemia, Moravia, Silesia, Slovakia and Carpathorussia (sometimes called Ruthenia).

== Sweden ==
The Swedish album, "Sveriges Rigsvapen, Landskaps- och Stadsvapen", was issued by Kaffe Hag AB in Stockholm in 1932. It was printed by Karl Lindholm in Stockholm. The author is Friherre Harald Gustav Fleetwood (1879–1960). Fleetwood was the State Herald of Sweden from 1931 to 1953 and author of many heraldic papers.

The album contains only the arms of provinces and towns. The stamps were issued in 8 sheets of 18 stamps each, with an additional 5 stamps with advertising. As far as is known there have been no plans to issue a second album with personal arms.

== Switzerland ==
The Swiss Coffee Hag series are the most complicated series of all the Coffee Hag albums. The Swiss albums were actually the first to be issued, as early as 1910 and were reprinted many times until the mid-1960s. This has resulted in a series of at least 76 different albums and more than 2500 variations in images. In total the number of stamps issued for the Swiss series is more than for all other series combined.

The series were started in 1911 with the first album with Kantons und Stadtwappen (arms of Cantons and cities), numbered 1-80. This album was printed at three different locations (München, Laupen and an unmarked issue) with the same images, but the stamps differed slightly in design. The 2nd album with arms of towns and villages (Stadt-und Dorfgemeinden, numbered 81–144) was also issued at the same time and same locations. The third album (images 145–288) was issued only at two locations in 1922. In 1923 the fourth album, named Stadt-und Dorfgemeinden (Serie C) was issued, and the numbering was started again with 1-48.

The series was then discontinued in the same style and redesigned. In 1926 the new series were started, in which not only town arms, but also personal and other arms were planned. The series started again with album 4, which has the same towns as the old series number 4, but now in a different design of album and images. Later albums 5-18 were issued in more or less the same style. Albums 4 and 5 were later combined to album 4/5, which, in a later issue, was again renamed album 5. In the 1950s the lay-out was changed again, and all albums (5–18) were issued with the new design, and an album 19 was added. Before WWII also two albums with arms of monasteries, dioceses and other religious arms were issued as numbers 1 and 2. An album 3 was never issued in the new series.

To complicate matters, the albums were also continuously revised. Arms were changed and updated due to recent grants, and the number of inhabitants was adjusted. In a few cases towns were replaced by other towns. This all resulted in at least 76 different albums.
