= Koprivnica =

- City
- Grad Koprivnica; City of Koprivnica
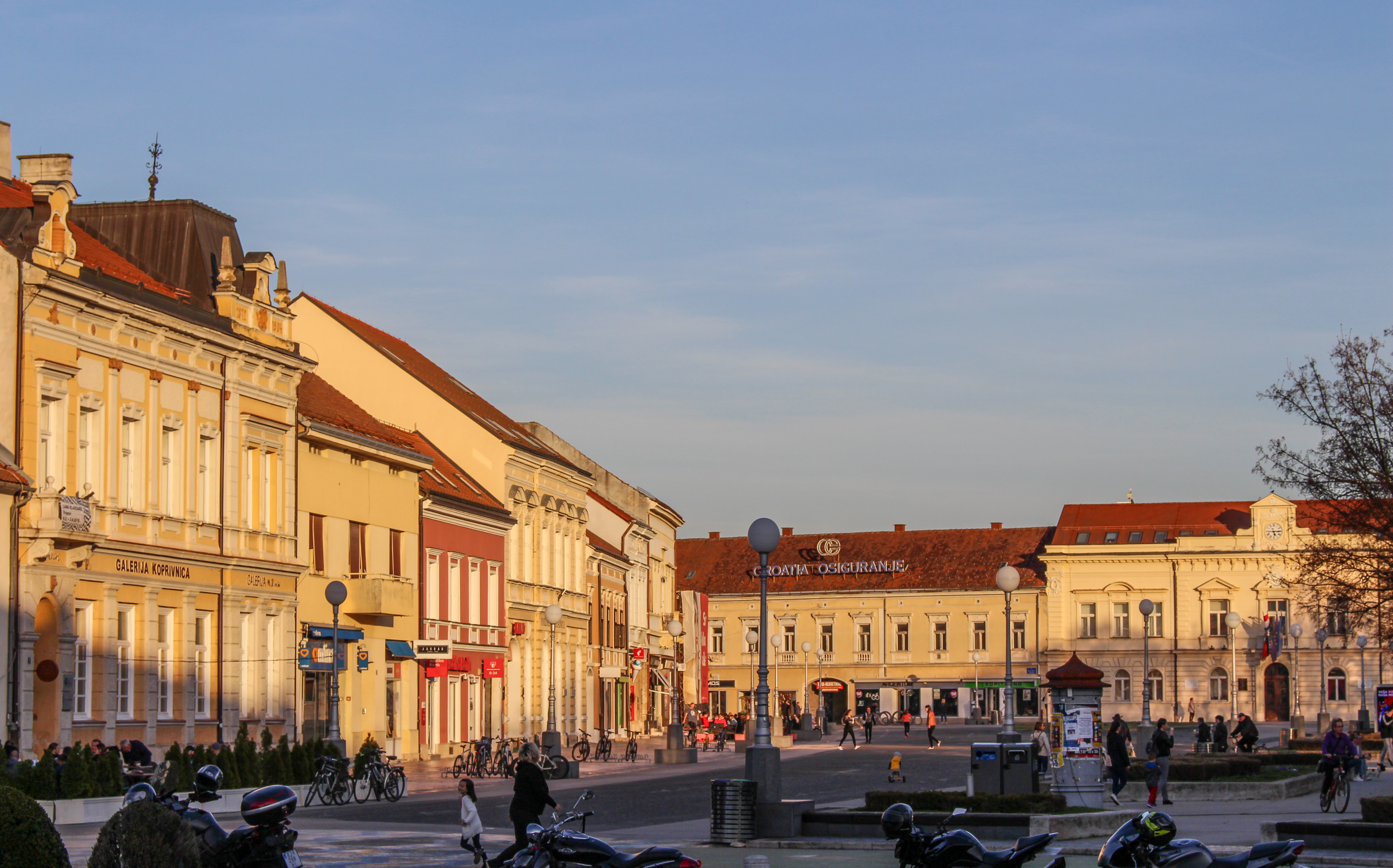
- Koprivnica

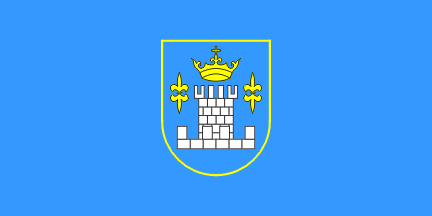
- Flag
- Interactive map of Koprivnica
- Location within Croatia
- Coordinates: 46°09′46″N 16°49′42″E
- Country: Croatia
- Region: Northern Croatia (Podravina)
- County: Koprivnica-Križevci County

Government
  - Mayor: Mišel Jakšić (SDP)
  - City Council: 21 members: • SDP, HSS, HNS, HSU, HL (11); • HDZ (6); • MREŽA (1); • Independent (3)

Area
  - City: 91.8 km^{2} (35.4 sq mi)
  - Urban: 38.6 km^{2} (14.9 sq mi)
- Elevation: 149 m (489 ft)

Population (2021)
  - City: 28,580
  - Density: 311/km^{2} (806/sq mi)
  - Urban: 22,262
  - Urban density: 577/km^{2} (1,490/sq mi)
- Time zone: UTC+1 (CET)
  - Summer (DST): UTC+2 (CEST)
- Postal code: 48000
- Area code: 048
- Vehicle registration: KC
- Website: koprivnica.hr

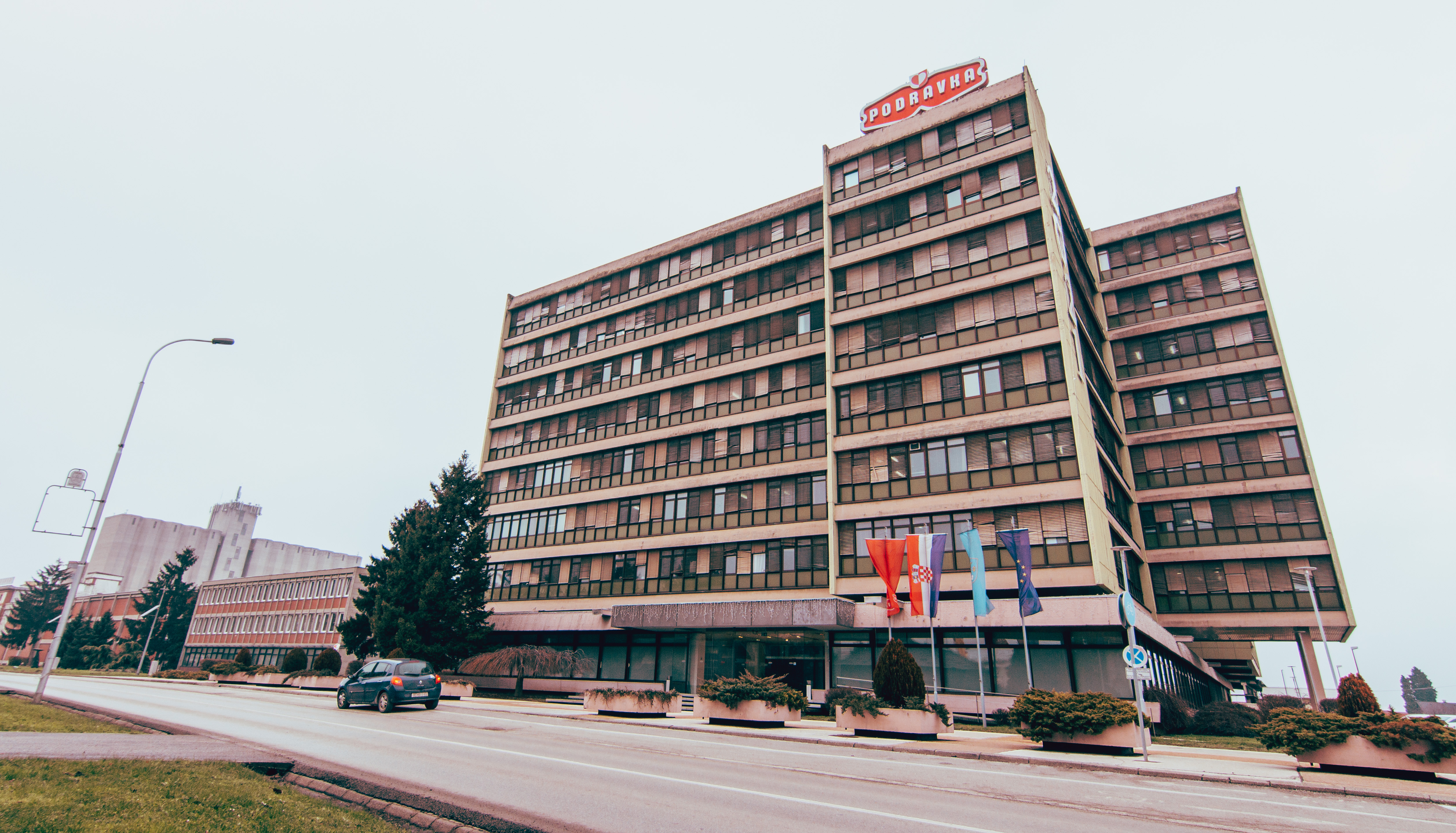
Podravka Headquarters

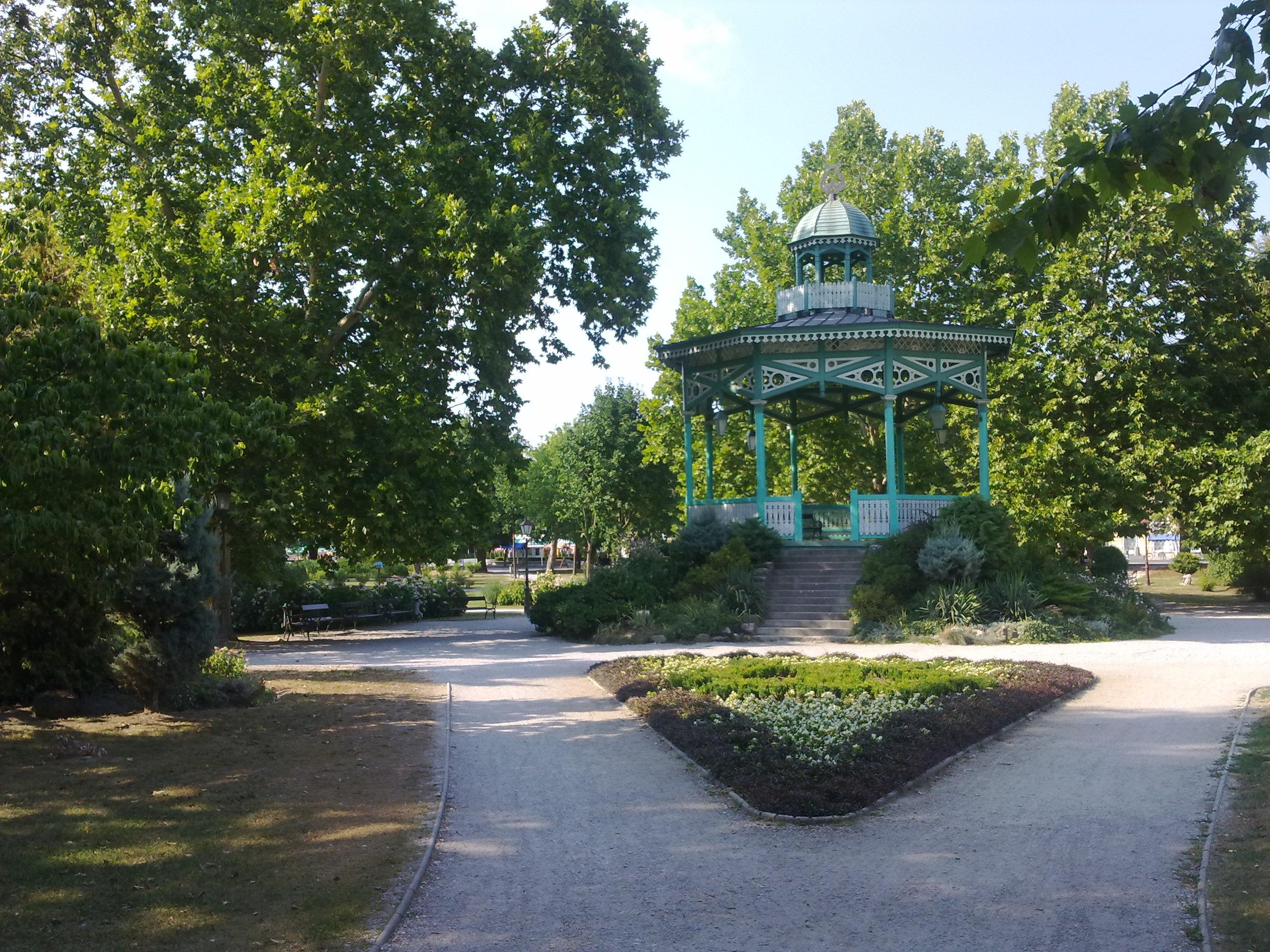
Pagoda in the city park

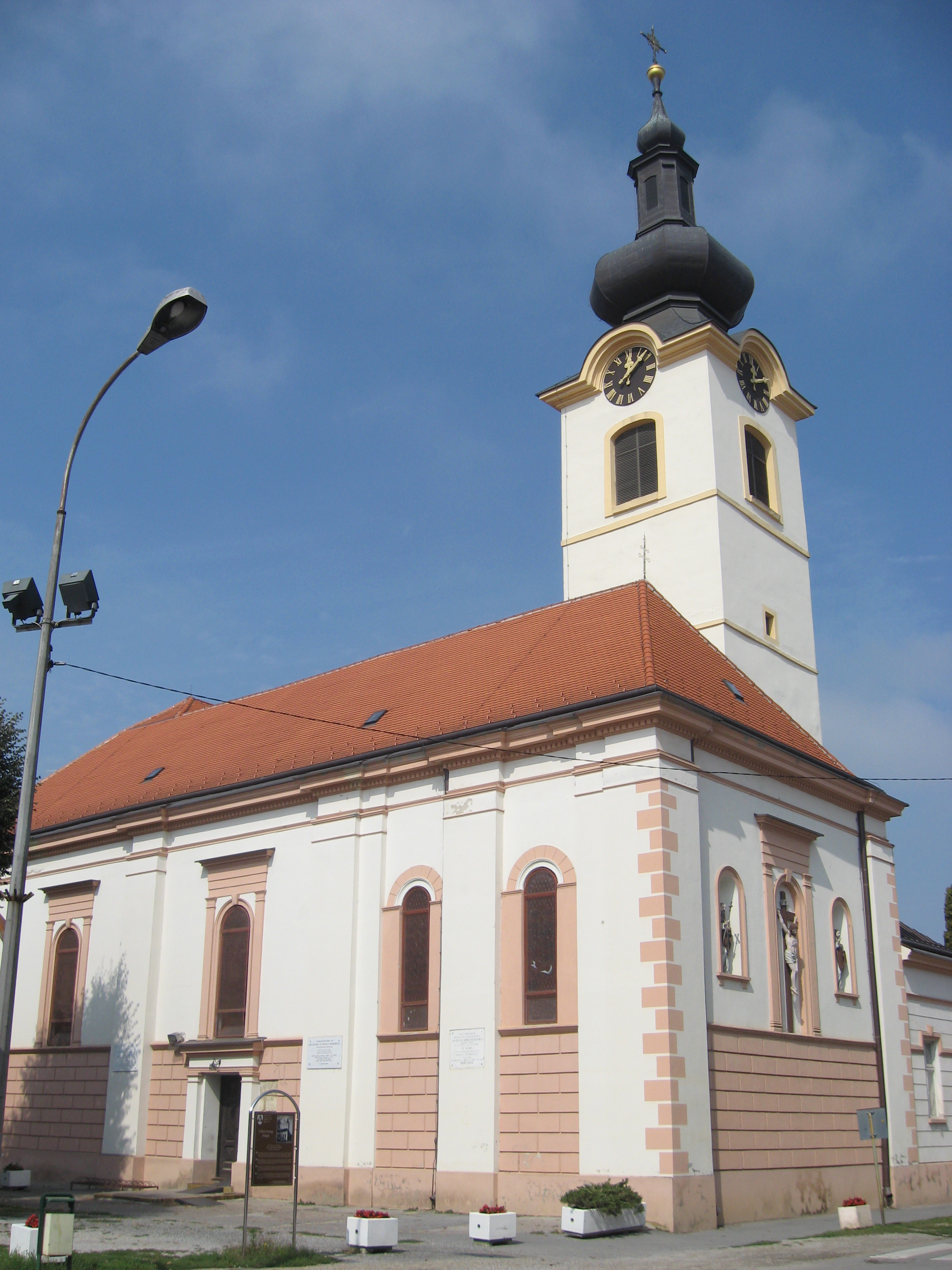
Church of Saint Nicholas

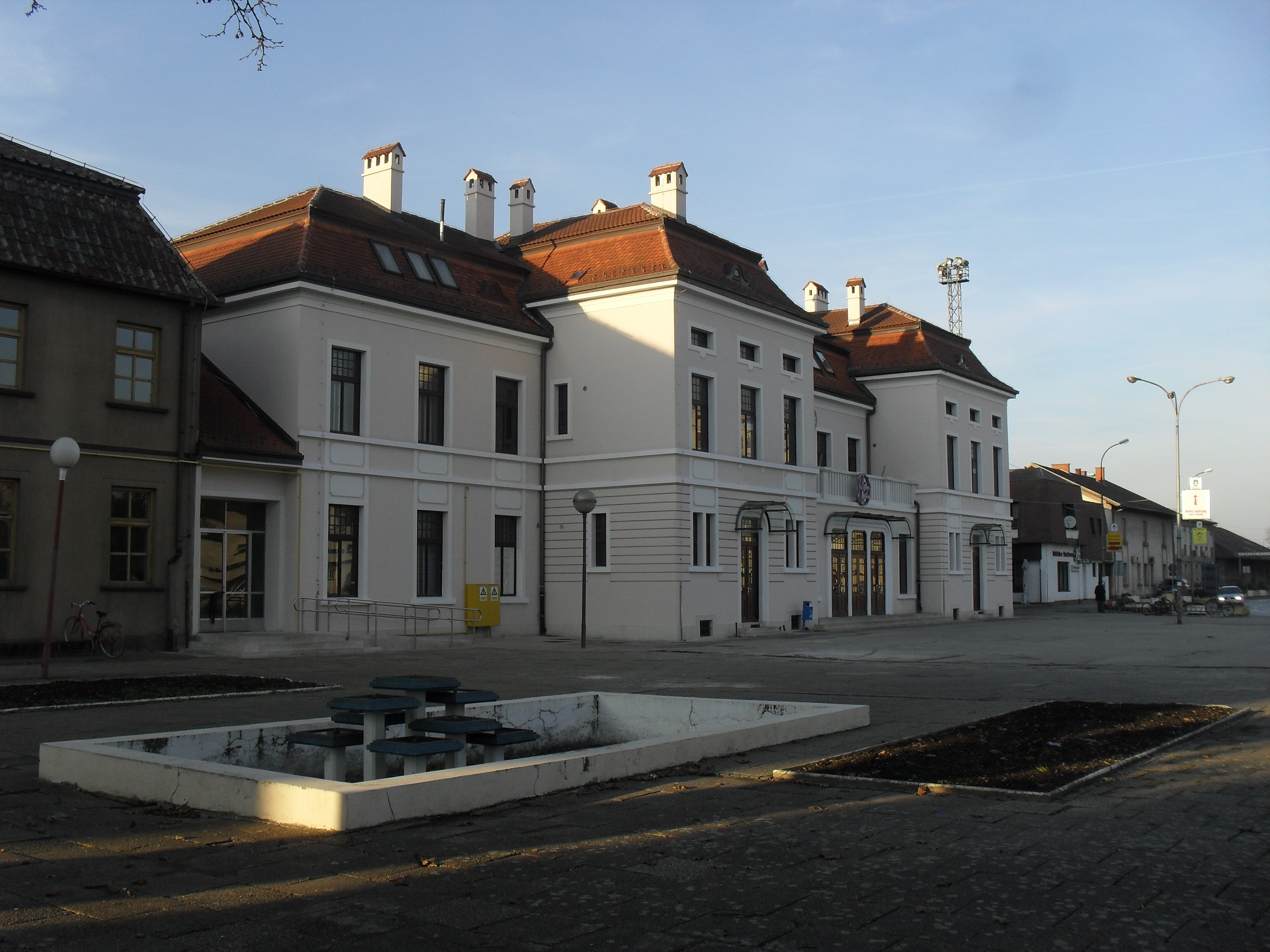
Railway station

Koprivnica (Croatian pronunciation: [kɔ̝̌priːv̞nit͡sa]) is a city in Northern Croatia, located 70 kilometers northeast of Zagreb. It is the capital and the largest city of Koprivnica-Križevci County. In 2021, the city's administrative area of 90.94 km^{2} had a total population of 28,580, with 22,262 in the city proper.

== History ==
Koprivnica has a history similar to that of nearby Varaždin: it was first mentioned in 1272 in a document by prince László IV and declared a free royal town by king Lajos I in 1356, and flourished as a trading place and a military fortress since that time.

In the 14th century, the town settlement further developed due to increased trade under the influence of Varaždin. During the construction of Renaissance fortification in the second half of the 16th century Koprivnica was the centre of the Slavonian military border. Koprivnica counted among its troops musketeers, German soldiers, hussars and infantry. At that time the Renaissance square emerged together with the Town hall which emphasized its Renaissance identity, so Koprivnica can today be legitimately considered a renaissance town.

The military aspect set it back somewhat when it was included in the Military Frontier in the 16th century during the wars with the Ottoman Turks, but after Maria Theresia's decree of 1765 it resumed life as a peaceful little merchant town which it was in reality.

Its position on the border of Habsburg monarchy and Ottoman Empire influenced the environment, economic, social and demographic changes, as well as everyday life. Koprivnica can therefore be considered a border town. In the second half of the 17th century Koprivnica was among the most developed royal towns in the Croatian-Slavonian Kingdom and its economic growth was initially based on strong trade activity. The fact that the three most significant churches (St. Nicholas, St. Anthony of Padua with the Franciscan monastery and church of the Assumption of Virgin Mary in Mocile further illustrates the economic power of the town in the 17th century. Economic activity was moved outside the town fortifications and this resulted in the wide and spacious baroque squares – today's Zrinski square and Jelačić square. At the same time the oldest streets evolved and they established the development base for the town until the present day.

In the 19th century, the old Renaissance and Baroque housing and buildings associated with trade were replaced by the now historical architecture and the new town centre acquired its present appearance. In 1863, the main part of the future town park was planted, and the removal of the old fortification together with the construction of the railway determined the regional development of the town. Railway connections enabled the development of industry and further established Koprivnica as a leading centre of the Podravina region. The Koprivnica Synagogue was built in 1875 in the centre of Koprivnica. Today it is listed as a cultural monument.

In the late 19th century and early 20th century, Koprivnica was a district capital in the Bjelovar-Križevci County of the Kingdom of Croatia-Slavonia. The first concentration and extermination camp established in the Independent State of Croatia during World War II was the Danica concentration camp established in Koprivnica.

Koprivnica developed significantly in the 20th century with the advent of the Podravka food industry, known worldwide for its Vegeta spice. They even have a museum devoted to the firm of Podravka.

Two separate volunteer fire departments DVD "Podravka" and DVD "Željezničar" were founded in 1947, and the DVD "Bilokalnik" in 1963, together under the VZ grada Koprivnice.

The annual "motifs of Podravina" event is when the whole town becomes a gallery of naïve art. Many of the greatest Croatian naïve artists come from the villages along the Drava in this county, notably Ivan Generalić.

== Demographics ==
Historical population
Year	Pop.	±%
1857	4,554	—
1869	5,823	+27.9%
1880	6,582	+13.0%
1890	7,574	+15.1%
1900	8,544	+12.8%
1910	11,552	+35.2%
1921	11,536	−0.1%
1931	11,932	+3.4%
1948	12,864	+7.8%
1953	14,139	+9.9%
1961	16,582	+17.3%
1971	21,104	+27.3%
1981	25,941	+22.9%
1991	29,706	+14.5%
2001	30,994	+4.3%
2011	30,854	−0.5%
2021	28,580	−7.4%
Source: Naselja i stanovništvo Republike Hrvatske 1857–2021, DZS

The list of settlements in the Koprivnica municipality is:

- Bakovčica, population 295
- Draganovec, population 444
- Herešin, population 682
- Jagnjedovec, population 301
- Koprivnica, population 22,262
- Kunovec Breg, population 578
- Reka, population 1,317
- Starigrad, population 2,248
- Štaglinec, population 453
City of Koprivnica: Population trends 1857–2021
v

population	4554	5823	6582	7574	8544	11552	11536	11932	12864	14139	16582	21104	25941	29706	30994	30854	28580
	1857	1869	1880	1890	1900	1910	1921	1931	1948	1953	1961	1971	1981	1991	2001	2011	2021

Sources: Croatian Bureau of Statistics publications

== Geography ==
Koprivnica (German: Kopreinitz, Hungarian: Kapronca) is situated at a strategic location – on the slopes of Bilogora and Kalnik to the south and river Drava to the north. Its position enabled it to develop numerous amenities for the wider area such as trade, crafts and administration, and in the 13th century Koprivnica became a town settlement. Koprivnica was named after the stream of the same name, which was first mentioned at the beginning of the 13th century during the Hungarian Kingdom.

=== Climate ===
Since records began in 1949, the highest temperature recorded at the local weather station was 39.1 °C (102.4 °F), on 24 August 2012. The coldest temperature was −26.1 °C (−15.0 °F), on 16 February 1956.

== Administration ==
The current mayor of Koprivnica is Mišel Jakšić and the Koprivnica Town Council consists of 19 seats.

Groups	Councilors per group
SDP-HSS-HSLS	14 / 19
HDZ-HDS-Mreža	3 / 19
Independents-HNS-HSU	2 / 19

== Education ==
=== Universities ===
Koprivnica and Varaždin took part in establishing the University North, a public national university that operates in both cities since 2015.

==== University North (University centre Koprivnica) ====
- Department of Media and Communication
- Department of Environmental protection, recycling and packaging
- Department of Communication, Media and Journalism
- Department of Logistics and Sustainable Mobility
- Department of Business and Management
- Department of Food Technology
- Department of Art Studies
- Department of Computing and Informatics

== Sports ==
The local chapter of the HPS is HPD "Bilo", which had 45 members in 1936 under the Pavao Orlović presidency. Membership rose to 46 in 1937. Membership fell to 20 in 1938.

== Notable people ==
- Vanna
- Zlata Bartl
- Ivan Brkić
- Stjepan Brodarić
- Žarko Dolinar
- Ivica Hiršl
- Rudolf Horvat
- Baltazar Dvorničić Napuly
- Ivan Generalić
- Ivan Golac
- Adriano Jagušić
- Slavko Löwy
- Armin Schreiner
- Milivoj Solar
- Dejan Šomoci
- Branko Švarc

== Sources ==
- Cresswell, Peterjon; Atkins, Ismay; Dunn, Lily (2006). Time Out Croatia (First ed.). London, Berkeley & Toronto: Time Out Group Ltd & Ebury Publishing, Random House Ltd. 20 Vauxhall Bridge Road, London SV1V 2SA. ISBN 978-1-904978-70-1.
- Bulatović, Radomir (1990). Koncentracioni logor Jasenovac s posebnim osvrtom na Donju Gradinu: istorijsko-sociološka i antropološka studija. Svjetlost. ISBN 978-86-01-01893-8.
- Council, United States Holocaust Memorial (1991). Days of remembrance, April 7–14, 1991: fifty years ago : from terror to systematic murder : planning guide. U.S. Holocaust Memorial Council.
- Rudolf Horvat, "Povijest slob. i kr. grada Koprivnice", Zagreb, 1943.
- Leander Brozović, "Građa za povijest Koprivnice", crteži i skice Stjepan Kukec, Koprivnica 1978.
- Milan Prelog, Ivanka Reberski, ur., Koprivnica – grad i spomenici, Zagreb 1986. ISBN 86-80195-01-4
- Nada Klaić, "Koprivnica u srednjem vijeku", Koprivnica 1987.
- Dragutin Feletar, "Podravina : općine Đurđevac, Koprivnica i Ludbreg u prošlosti i sadašnjosti", Koprivnica : Centar za kulturu, 1988.
- Petrić, Hrvoje (2000). Koprivnica na razmeđi epoha (1765–1870). Zavod za hrvatsku povijest Filozofskog fakulteta u Zagrebu i Nakladna kuća dr. Feletar. ISBN 953-6235-54-4.
- Mirela Slukan Altić, ur., Povijesni atlas gradova - Koprivnica, Zagreb-Koprivnica 2005. ISBN 953-6666-42-1

== Gallery ==
Koprivnica
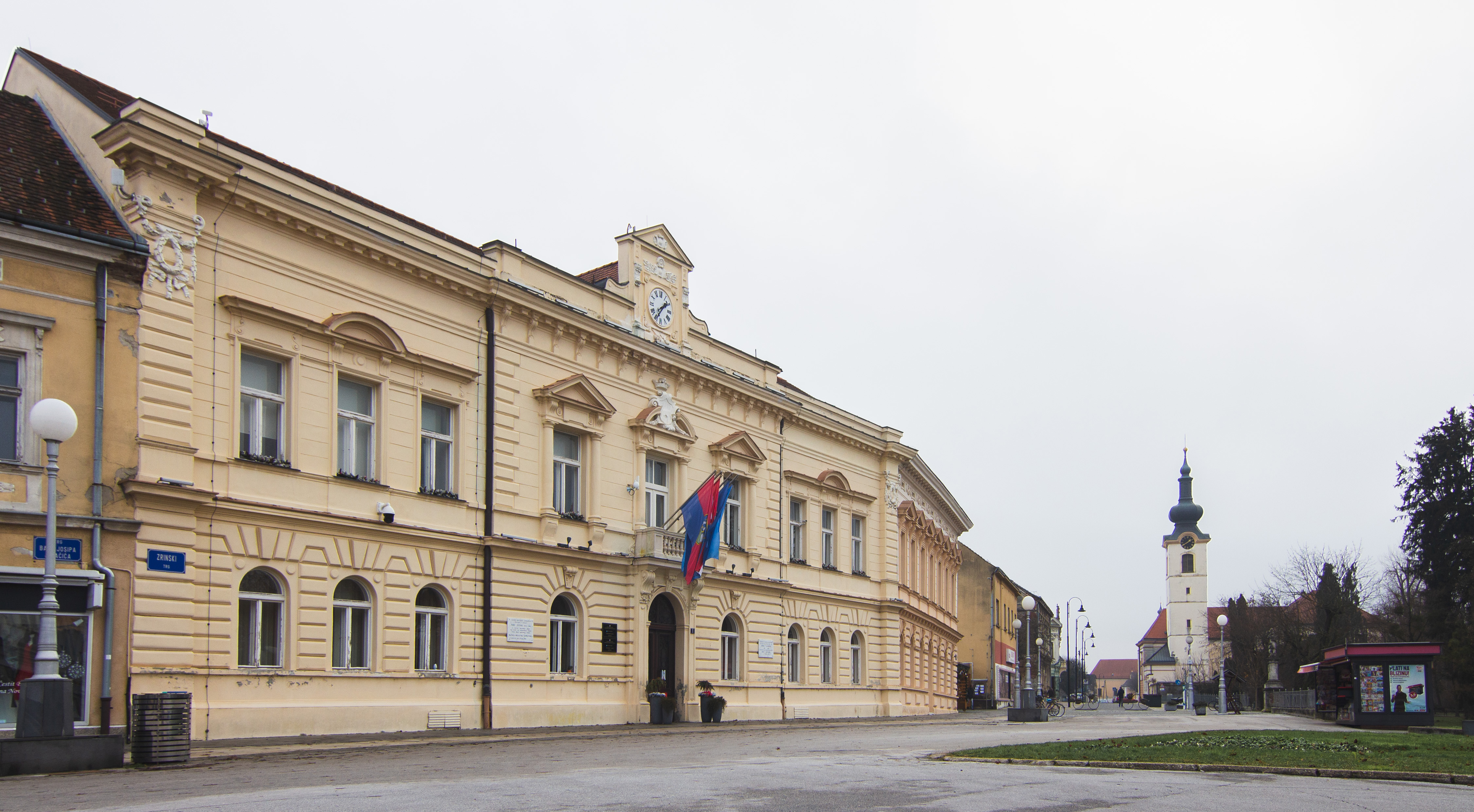
Koprivnica city hall

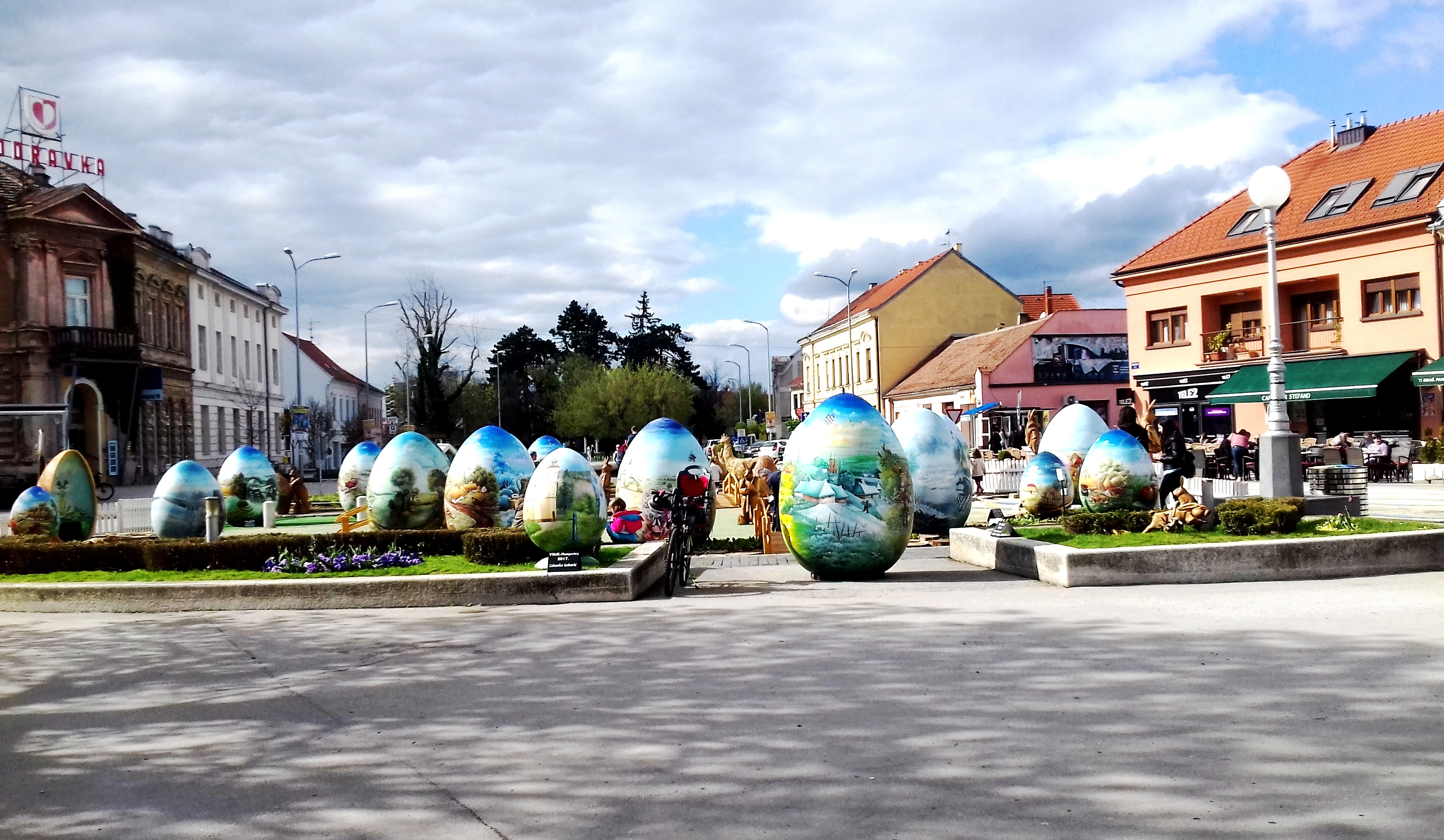
Koprivnica Easter activities
