= Dejan Šomoci =

Croatian footballer

Personal information
- Full name: Dejan Šomoci
- Date of birth: 24 January 1983 (age 43)
- Place of birth: Koprivnica, SFR Yugoslavia
- Height: 1.75 m (5 ft 9 in)
- Position: Midfielder

Senior career*
Years	Team	Apps	(Gls)
2003–2008	Slaven Belupo	55	(2)
2008–2009	Koprivnica		
2010	Drava Podravske Sesvete		
2010-2011	Drava Novigrad Podravski		
2011	Slaven Belupo		
2012-2013	Podravec Torčec		
2013–2015	Tehnicar 1974		
- * Club domestic league appearances and goals as of 19 May 2007

Dejan Šomoci (born 24 January 1983) is a Croatian retired football midfielder.

In June 2021, Šomoci was reportedly assumed to take the role of sports director at Slaven Belupo, but he became a board member and assistant to new sports director Zoran Zekić in March 2022.
