= Baltazar Dvorničić Napuly =

Croatian Catholic cleric and lawyer (1560–1634)

Baltazar Dvorničić Napuly (1560 – 29 March 1634) was a Croatian Catholic cleric and lawyer. He is notable for establishing the first private law school in Zagreb, and for his efforts to establish the Croatian college in Austria.

== Biography ==
A native of Koprivnica, Baltazar was a student at University of Bologna during, at least, 1581. Some have claimed that he had previously studied in Graz and Vienna, but clear evidence is lacking. In Bologna, he had earned his degrees in philosophy, theology, and both civil and canon law by 1588. From November 1589 to December 1591, he was principal of the Hungarian–Illyrian (Croatian) college in Bologna. At this time, he wrote his book Methodica Processum Directio (1590), on civil law, which shows the fruits of his collaboration with his friends Gašpar Petričević and Ivan Kitonić. It was reprinted by Kitonić, without acknowledgement and under an altered title, in 1619.

In 1588, while still studying and writing, he was appointed as archdeacon of Varaždin, then in 1591 archdeacon of Gorički. Returning to Zagreb in 1597, he took up posts at Zagreb (Kaptol) cathedral, becoming in 1600 a custodian, and in 1601 a lecturer. In 1613 he was appointed prepositor (prepošt, the principal ecclesiastical dean of Zagreb Kaptol). He also served as a member in the Hungarian parliament, and chairman of the High Court or Banski stol. He wrote and published several books on law, and established the first private law school in Zagreb, where he taught both civil and canon law. He died on 29 March, 1634 in Zagreb. After his death, he left his money to the founding of the Croatian-language college at the University of Vienna, Collegium Croaticum Viennense.

== Works ==
- Methodical conduct of the procedure (Methodica processuum directio, 1590)

== Sources ==
- Ernečić, Dražen (1999). Baltazar Napuly Dvorničić (1560.-1624.). Koprivnica.
