= Block book =

Early Western block-printed book

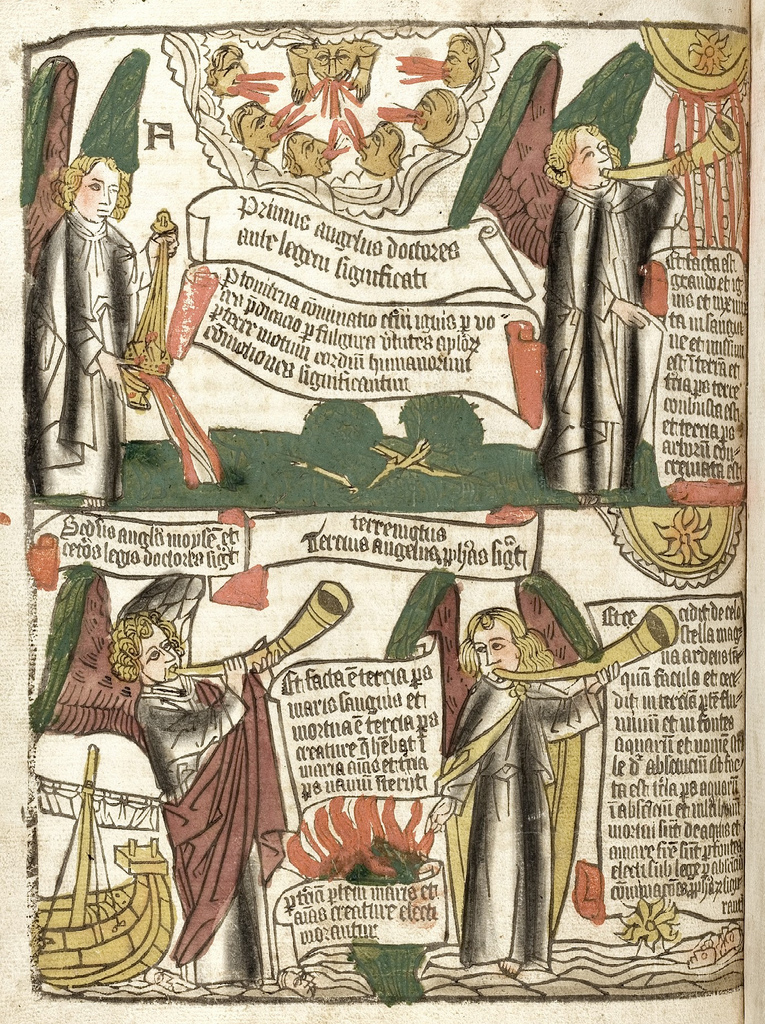
Page from the Apocalypse text, possibly the earliest of the blockbooks, with added hand-colouring

Block books or blockbooks, also called xylographica, are short books of up to 50 leaves, block printed in Europe in the second half of the 15th century as woodcuts with blocks carved to include both text (usually) and illustrations. The content of the books was nearly always religious, aimed at a popular audience, and a few titles were often reprinted in several editions using new woodcuts. Although many had believed that block books preceded Gutenberg's invention of movable type in the first part of the 1450s, it now is accepted that most of the surviving block books were printed in the 1460s or later, and that the earliest surviving examples may date to about 1451.

They seem to have functioned as a cheap popular alternative to the typeset book, which was still very expensive at this stage. Single-leaf woodcuts from the preceding decades often included passages of text with prayers, indulgences and other material; the block book was an extension of this form. Block books are very rare, some editions surviving only in fragments, and many probably not surviving at all.

Some copies have added watercolour on the images, added either near the time of printing or later.

== Description ==
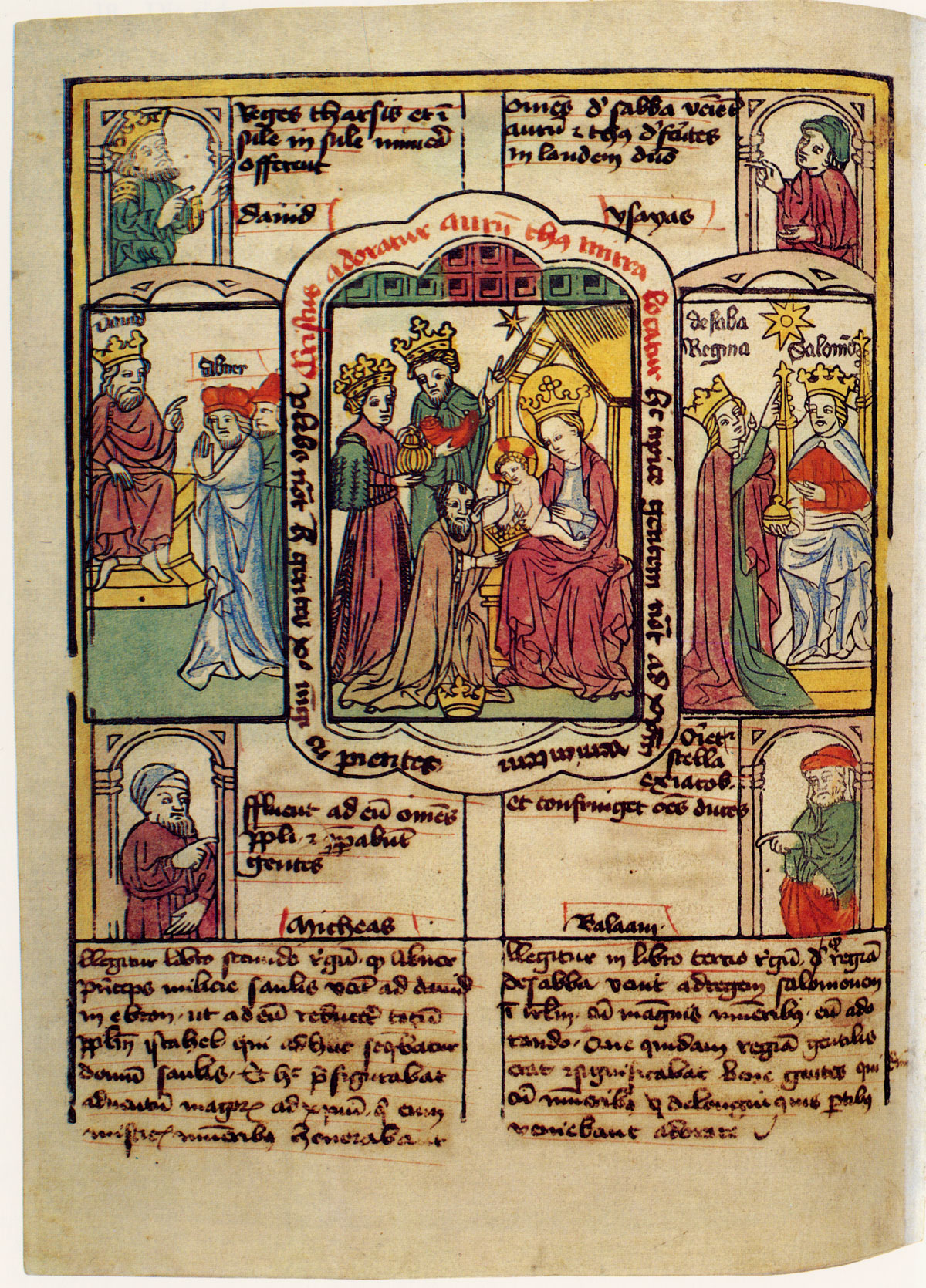
Biblia Pauperum or "Bible of the Poor", woodcut illustrations with manuscript text

Block books are short books, 50 or fewer leaves, that were printed in the second half of the 15th century from wood blocks in which the text and illustrations were both cut. Some block books, called chiro-xylographic (from the Greek cheir (χειρ) "hand") contain only the printed illustrations, with the text added by hand. Some books also were made with the illustrations printed from woodcuts, but the text printed from movable metal type, but are nevertheless considered block books because of their method of printing (only on one side of a sheet of paper) and their close relation to "pure" block books. Block books are categorized as incunabula, or books printed before 1501. The only example of the block book form that contains no images is the school textbook Latin grammar of Donatus.

Block books were almost exclusively "devoted to the propagation of the faith through pictures and text" and "interpreted events drawn from the Bible or other sources in medieval religious thought. The woodcut pictures in all were meaningful even to the illiterate and semi-literate, and they aided clerics and preaching monks to dramatise their sermons."

== Origin ==
Woodblock printing was invented in China sometime during the second half of the first millennium AD, but it is disputed as to whether or not woodblock printing in Europe was a native invention or came from China. Some believe it spread from the east while others believe it was independently invented in Europe.

There is no hard evidence that Chinese printing technology spread to Europe. However a number of authors have advanced theories in favor of a Chinese origin for European printing based on early references and circumstantial evidence. Tsien Tsuen-hsuin suggests that woodblock printing may have spread from China to Europe due to communications during the Mongol Empire era and based on similarities between blockprints in both areas. He suggests that European missionaries to China during the 14th century could have borrowed the practice of creating prints to be colored manually later on, which had been prevalent in China for a long time with Buddhist prints. The block books of Europe were produced using methods and materials similar to those in China and sometimes in ways contrary to prevailing European norms: European wood blocks were cut parallel with the grain in the same way as the Chinese method rather than the prevailing European practice of cutting across the grain, water-based ink was used rather than oil-based ink, only one side of the paper was printed rather than both, and rubbing rather than pressure was employed to leave the print. Robert Curzon, 14th Baron Zouche (1810 – 1873) held the opinion that European and Chinese block books were so similar in every way that they must have originated in China.

The question of whether printing originated in Europe or China was raised in the early 16th century by a Portuguese poet, Garcia de Resende (1470 – 1536). Paolo Giovio (1483 – 1552), an Italian historian who had come into possession of several Chinese books and maps through João de Barros (1496 – 1570), claimed that printing was invented in China and spread to Europe through Russia. Juan González de Mendoza (1545 – 1618) made similar claims about printing coming from China through Russia but also added another route through Arabia by sea and that it influenced Johannes Gutenberg. Several other authors throughout the 16th century repeated such statements.

Others such as Arthur M. Hind and Joseph P. McDermott dispute the theory of Chinese printing being transmitted to Europe. Hind believes that European block printing grew out of a single woodcut which developed from block-printing on textiles while McDermott emphasizes the lack of evidence. Although the Mongols planned to use printed paper currency in Persia, the scheme failed shortly thereafter. No books were printed in Persia before the 19th century and Chinese prints apparently made little impact on the region. There are no surviving printed playing cards from the Middle East while pre-1450 printed cards from medieval Europe contained no text. Although some elite Europeans were aware of printed paper money by the late 13th century, the earliest evidence that Europeans were aware of Chinese book printing only appeared in the early 16th century. McDermott argues that modern comparisons of techniques used in European and Chinese block books are ahistorical and that rather than direct transmission of technique, similarities between them were just as likely the result of convergent evolution.

== Printing method ==
Block books were typically printed as folios, with two pages printed on one full sheet of paper which was then folded once for binding. Several such leaves would be inserted inside another to form a gathering of leaves, one or more of which would be sewn together to form the complete book.

The earlier block books were printed on only one side of the paper (anopisthographic), using a brown or grey, water based ink. It is believed they were printed by rubbing pressure, rather than a printing press. The nature of the ink and/or the printing process did not permit printing on both sides of the paper – damage would result from rubbing the surface of the first side to be printed in order to print the second. When bound together, the one sided sheets produced two pages of images and text, followed by two blank pages. The blank pages were ordinarily pasted together, so as to produce a book without blanks – the Chinese had reached the same solution to the problem. In the 1470s, an oil based ink was introduced permitting printing on both sides of the paper (opisthographic) using a regular printing press.

Block books often were printed using a single wood block that carried two pages of text and images, or by individual blocks with a single page of text and image. The illustrations commonly were colored by hand.

== Dates and locations of printing ==
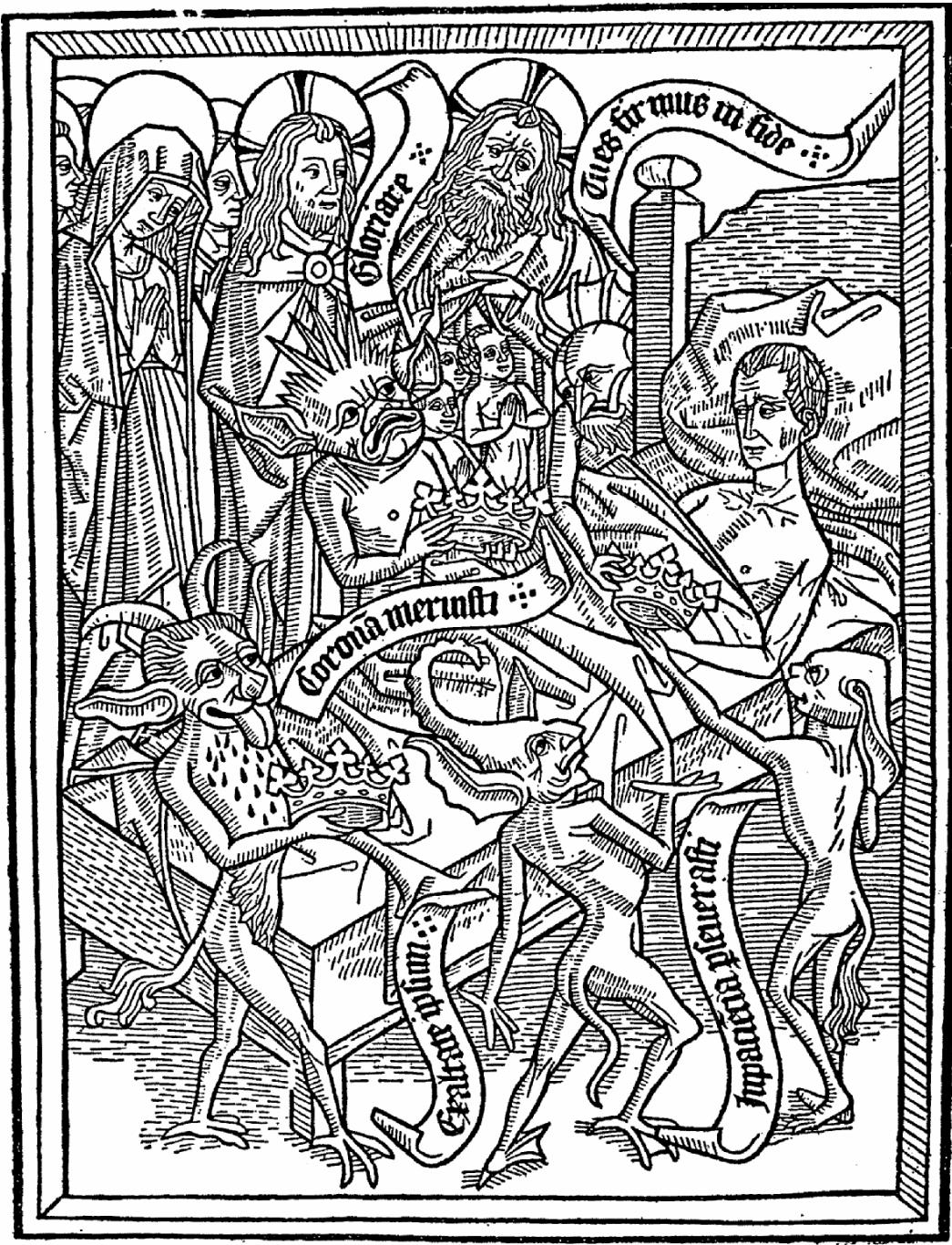
Ars Moriendi, Netherlands, c. 1460

Block books are almost always undated and without statement of printer or place of printing. Determining their dates of printing and relative order among editions has been an extremely difficult task. In part because of their sometimes crude appearance, it was generally believed that block books dated to the first half of the 15th century and were precursors to printing by movable metal type, invented by Gutenberg in the early 1450s. The style of the woodcuts was used to support such early dates, although it is now understood that they may simply have copied an older style. Early written reports relating to "printing" also suggested, to some, early dates, but are ambiguous.

Written notations of purchase and rubrication dates, however, lead scholars to believe that the books were printed later. Wilhelm Ludwig Schreiber, a leading nineteenth-century scholar of block books, concluded that none of the surviving copies could be dated before 1455-60. Allan H. Stevenson, by comparing the watermarks in the paper used in blockbooks with watermarks in dated documents, concluded that the "heyday" of blockbooks was the 1460s, but that at least one dated from about 1451.

Block books printed in the 1470s were often of cheaper quality. Block books continued to be printed sporadically up through the end of the 15th century. One block book is known from about 1530, a collection of Biblical images with text, printed in Italy.

Most of the earlier block books are believed to have been printed in the Netherlands, and later ones in Southern Germany, likely in Nuremberg, Ulm, Augsburg, and Schwaben, among a few other locales.

== Texts ==
A 1991 census of surviving copies of block books identifies 43 different "titles" (some of which may include different texts). However, a small number of texts were very popular and together account for the great majority of surviving copies of block books. These texts were reprinted many times, often using new woodcuts copying the earlier versions. It is generally accepted that the Apocalypse was the earliest block book, one edition of which Allan H. Stevenson dates to c. 1450–52. The following is a partial list of texts, with some links to digitized online copies:

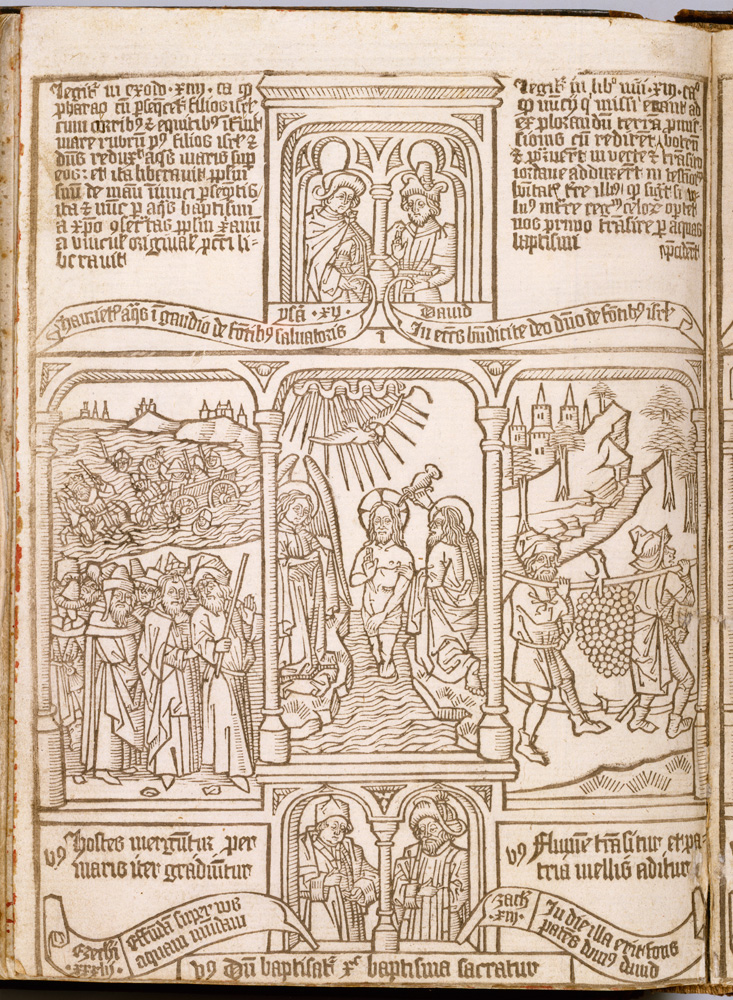
Biblia Pauperum ("Bible of the Poor")

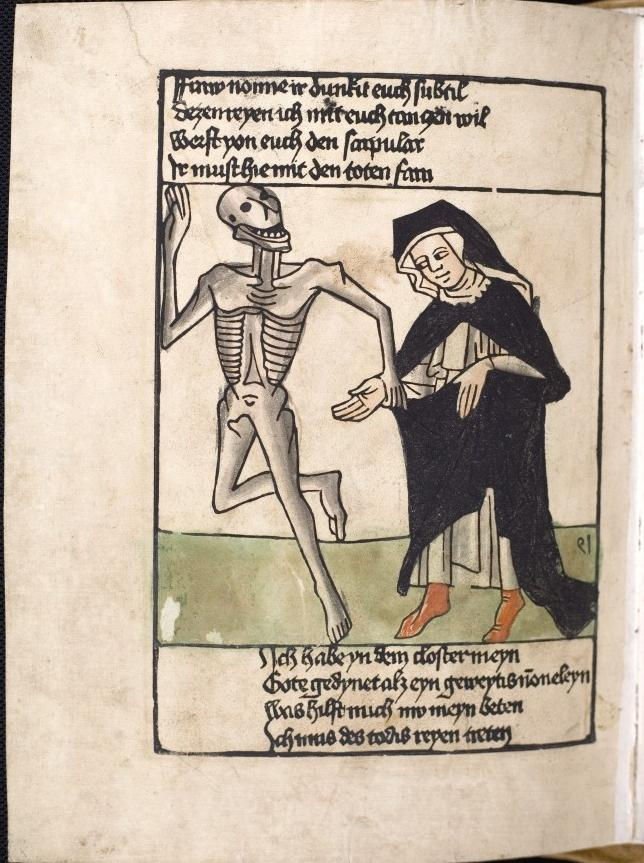
Heidelberg Dance of Death

- Apocalypsis Sancti Johannis cum figuris, the Apocalypse, containing scenes and text from the Apocalypse and the apocryphal life of St. John.
  - Germany, 1450–1452, Cambridge Digital Library.
  - Netherlands, 1465-70, Bavarian State Library.
  - Germany, 1468-70, Bavarian State Library.
  - Germany, 1468-70, Bavarian State Library.
- Ars Memorandi per figuras evangelistarum, an anonymous work with mnemonic images of events in the Four Gospels.
  - Southern Germany (?), after 1470?, Bavarian State Library.
  - Southern Germany (?), after 1470?, Bavarian State Library.
  - Southern Germany (?), possibly Nuremberg or Schwaben, c. 1470-75, Bavarian State Library.
- Ars Moriendi, the "Art of Dying", offering advice on the protocols and procedures of a good death. The first edition of this work has been called "the great masterpiece of the Netherlandish blockbooks."
  - Netherlands, c. 1465, Library of Congress.
  - South German, possibly Ulm, c. 1475, Bavarian State Library
- Biblia Pauperum or "Bible of the Poor", a comparison of Old and New Testament stories with images, "probably intended for the poor (or lesser) clergy rather than for the poor layman (or the unlearned)."
  - Netherlands or Niederrhein, 1460-65, Schweinfurt, Bibliothek Otto Schäfer.
  - Netherlands, 1460-63, Schweinfurt, Bibliothek Otto Schäfer.
  - Nuremberg, 1472, Bavarian State Library.
- Canticum Canticorum or Song of Songs.
  - Germany, c. 1469-70, Bavarian State Library.
  - Germany, c. 1469-70, Bavarian State Library.
- Aelius Donatus Ars minor, a popular text of the parts of speech and the only exclusively textual work to be printed as a block book.
  - Rheinland (?), before 1475?, Bavarian State Library
- Exercitium Super Pater Noster, containing woodcuts and text interpreting the Lord's Prayer.
- Speculum Humanae Salvationis or "Mirror of Man's Salvation". Only one pure block book edition was printed; other editions have the text printed by metal type, but printed on only one side of the paper.
  - Netherlands, c. 1468-79, Bavarian State Library.
- Dance of Death, depicting dancing skeletons appearing before their victims from various classes, trades and professions, was the subject of a few block books, the most famous of which is at Heidelberg University.
  - South Germany(?), 1465-60(?), Bavarian State Library.
- The Fable of the Sick Lion.
- Other works
  - In addition to the above texts, block books include some calendars and almanacs.

== Collections ==
Because of their popular nature, few copies of block books survive today, many existing only in unique copies or even fragments. Block books have received intensive scholarly study and many block books have been digitized and are available online.

The following institutions have important collections of block-books (the number of examples includes fragments or even single leaves and is taken from Sabine Mertens et al., Blockbücher des Mittelalters, 1991, pp. 355–395, except where a footnote provides another source):

- Bibliothèque Nationale de France, Paris. 49 examples.
- Bavarian State Library, Munich. 46 examples.
- British Library, London. 44 examples.
- Morgan Library, New York. 24 examples.
- State Museum Kupferstichkabinett (Print room), Berlin. 20 examples.
- John Rylands Library, Manchester. 17 examples.
- Austrian National Library, Vienna. 16 examples.
- University Library Heidelberg. 12 examples.
- Rijksmuseum, Den Haag. 11 examples.
- Herzog August Bibliothek, Wolfenbüttel. 11 examples.
- Lessing Rosenwald collection in the Library of Congress. 10 examples.
- LMU Munich's University Library, Munich. 10 examples.
- Bodleian Library, Oxford. 8 examples.
- Biblioteca de Catalunya, Barcelona. Three woodblocks used to print 16th century block books and one printed bull.
