= Otto Hupp =

German graphical artist (1859–1949)

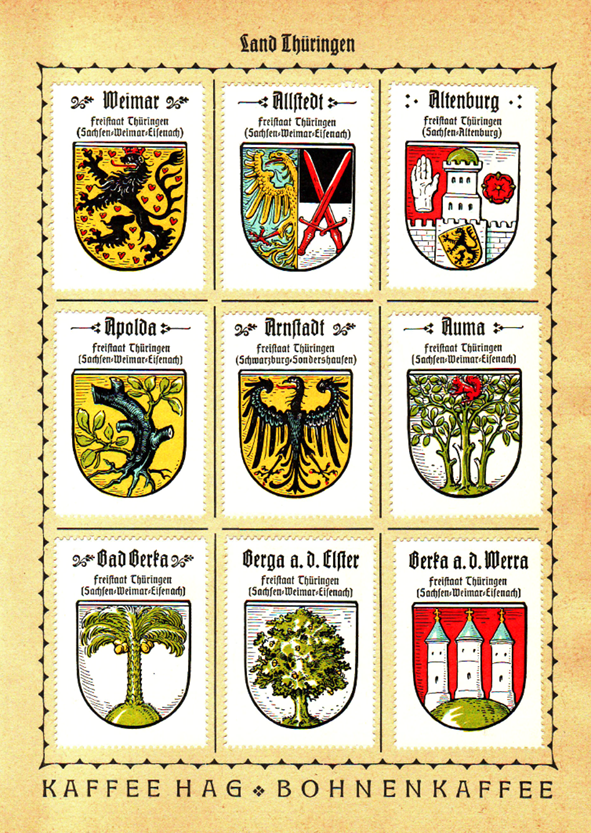
Examples of Hupp's work

Hermann Joseph Otto Hubert August Constantin Hupp (May 21, 1859 – January 31, 1949) was a German graphical artist. His main working area was heraldry, yet he also worked as a typeface designer, creating commercial symbols and metal works.

== Life and career ==
Hupp was born in Düsseldorf, Kingdom of Prussia, the fourth of five sons of the engraver Carl Heinrich Hupp. His father made him learn engraving as his profession, and, shortly after finishing his education, he moved to Munich in 1878. From 1891 till his death, Hupp lived in the suburb Oberschleißheim. From the painter Rudolf von Seitz he learned many styles of painting, and when he met the architect Gabriel von Seidl he received several contracts to paint wall and ceiling frescos.

Hupp's main field of work was heraldry, painting more than 6,000 coats of arms and writing books on heraldry. His Wappen und Siegel der deutschen Städte, Flecken und Dörfer (Coats of Arms and Seals of German Cities, Places and Villages book series was started in 1895, but of the originally ten planned volumes only five were finished. 3,300 of his paintings of coats of arms were published as a collecting set from the coffee company Kaffee HAG from 1913–18 and 1926–38. This publication helped to make heraldry better known to the general public. Another important heraldic publication by Hupp were the Münchener Kalender (Munich calendar), of which 51 issues were published between 1885 and 1936 (the issue of 1933 was omitted). Besides painting existing coats of arms, he also created many designs for municipalities which were applying for new arms. Possibly his most important coat of arms was the 1923 version for the state of Bavaria, which, however, was replaced with a new version after World War II.

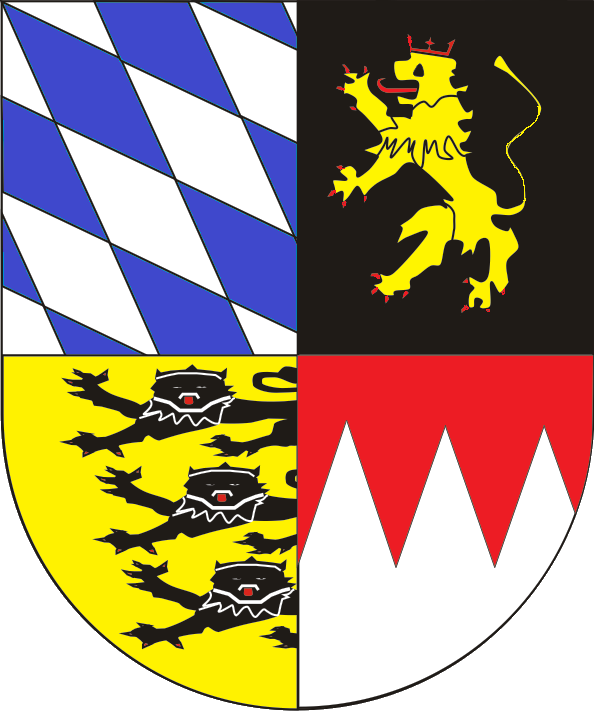
Bavarian coat of arms (1923-1950)

The first typographic works of Hupp were made in 1883. His first typeface, Neudeutsch, was published in 1899 by Genzsch & Heyse. He created several further typeface later, such as Hupp-Gotisch, Hupp-Fraktur, and Hupp-Antiqua. However, as his typefaces were not designed for standard uses, they did not spread much, and are nowadays mostly forgotten. None of them were ever converted for use in phototypesetting, though some have been made available as digital fonts.

Other significant works of Hupp include metal works for Speyer Cathedral in 1904 (which also gained him the title professor in 1906), the cover of an astronomical clock donated to the city of Munich, beer steins, and the company logo of the Spaten brewery.

Though Hupp was undoubtedly an artist, he himself did not claim to be one, preferring to say that he was simply using the technique of an artist, but failing to have the creativity of one.

== The Constance Missal ==
As reference material for his work as a type designer, Hupp collected early books and incunabula (books printed prior to 1501). Around 1880 he purchased a copy of an incunable which came to be known as the Constance Missal or Missale Speciale (five complete or partial copies are known). About 1895 he made a study of the volume and concluded that it had qualities in typography and production which suggested it was earlier than the Gutenberg Bible. Though he sold his copy, after several decades the argument took hold and by 1940 the Missal was recognized as predating Gutenberg's famous work. In 1954, a copy was sold to the Morgan Library for US$100,000. However, by the early 1960s further research by Allan H. Stevenson using watermark analysis demonstrated it was actually printed 20 years later than Gutenberg's work (in the fall of 1473).
