= Allan H. Stevenson =

American bibliographer (1903–1970)

Allan Henry Stevenson
- Born: June 20, 1903; Merlin, Ontario, Canada
- Died: March 31, 1970 (aged 66); Chicago, Illinois, United States
- Occupation: Bibliographer
- Known for: Analysis of paper and watermarks

Allan Henry Stevenson (June 20, 1903 – March 31, 1970) was an American bibliographer specializing in the study of handmade paper and watermarks who "single-handedly created a new field: the bibliographical analysis of paper." Through his pioneering studies of watermarks, Stevenson solved "the most fascinating, and perhaps the most notorious, bibliographical problem of our time," the dating of the Missale Speciale or Constance Missal, an undated incunable (book printed before 1501) believed by many to pre-date the Gutenberg Bible (c. 1455), and possibly to have been the first printed European book. Stevenson proved that the book in fact had been printed nearly twenty years later, in 1473. Through similar analysis of watermarks, he also established that most block books, small religious books in which the text and images were printed from a single woodcut block and which many believed dated from the early 15th century, had in fact been printed after 1460.

== Biography ==
Stevenson was born on June 20, 1903, in Merlin, Ontario, Canada. His family moved to Texas where he attended the Rice Institute in Houston, graduating in 1924, and obtaining an M.A. two years later. After teaching at Rice, he moved to the University of Chicago where he ultimately obtained his doctorate degree in 1949. He taught English at both schools. Stevenson married Rachel Waples. He died in Chicago on March 31, 1970.

== Bibliographical studies ==
=== Watermarks are twins ===
"Squareface"

"Wideface"

Twin bull's head watermarks, the dots showing where they were tied to the screen

Handmade paper is manufactured using a metal screen held in a wood frame which is dipped into a paper slurry, after which the frame is shaken in a particular manner to set the fibers of the paper and form a sheet, which is then removed to dry. The screen would usually have attached a design made of copper or brass wire which would leave a slight impression or watermark in the sheet of paper. In his 1952 article "Watermarks are Twins", Stevenson discussed a fact that few bibliographers then understood, that handmade paper in earlier periods was ordinarily manufactured using twin moulds, the screens of which bore a near duplicate wire image producing almost identical, but nevertheless distinguishable, watermarks. Two workers would use a pair of frames acting in tandem, one using a frame to dip into the paper slurry while the second (the "coucher") would shake the other frame to set the fibers and would then remove the paper to dry. He also observed that, as the screens were used repeatedly to make paper, the wire figures would suffer distortion, pieces of them sometimes breaking loose and having to be retied to the screen. A stock of paper manufactured by hand thus would contain two closely similar watermarks which define the stock for bibliographic purposes, or as Stevenson said, "watermarks like wrens go in pairs." A particular watermark could be uniquely identified by its position with respect to the "chainlines" formed by the metal screen, its state of freshness or deterioration, and the precise locations where it was tied or retied to the screen, which show up as dots in the watermark. He would later use these basic observations to date the manufacture of paper used in early printed books.

=== The Missale Speciale ===
In early 1954, the Pierpont Morgan Library (now the Morgan Library & Museum) announced the acquisition of a copy of the Missale Speciale, or the Constance Missal, a rare undated incunable printed from the same type used in the 1457 Psalter printed by Johann Fust and Peter Schöffer, but seemingly in a more primitive and unfinished state. The Morgan Library and many bibliographers believed the Missale Speciale pre-dated the Gutenberg Bible and was the first European book printed using movable type, basing the belief on the work of Otto Hupp around 1895. The Morgan had purchased the book from the famous rare book dealer Hans P. Kraus, paying him $58,000 in cash and trading four extremely rare books, including two incunables printed by William Caxton. Hearing of the Morgan's acquisition, Stevenson began an analysis of its watermarks, and initial work quickly led him to conclude that the paper dated from the 1470s. In 1960, as Stevenson learned that two German bibliographers were reaching the same conclusion, he announced his discovery. In 1962, he published two articles on the Missale Speciale and in 1966 he published his full length study on it, The Problem of the Missale Speciale.

In his Problem of the Missale Speciale, Stevenson analyzed the four then known copies of the missal, along with a fifth shorter version. He reported that surviving copies of the book contained several "runs", i.e., a number of consecutive gatherings of paper, with the same three watermarks (including their twins), a cross on mounts and two different bull's heads under a Tau cross. Stevenson identified several states of these watermarks in the book, reflecting the aging of the watermark as stress was repeatedly applied to the screen in making the paper. He identified the same watermarks in other books which included their dates of printing or were otherwise firmly datable. In fact, some of those books contained both the identical cross on mounts and identical bull's head watermarks. Moreover, he traced the deteriorating states of the bull's head watermarks through a number of dated or datable books, thereby determining the relationship between a particular state of the watermark with the date of the book, and through that analysis, to identify the date of the watermark on the basis of its condition. Through this information, Stevenson precisely dated the printing of the Missale Speciale to the fall of 1473. Bibliographers now accept this proof that the missal was printed in 1473 as "conclusive".

=== Runs and remnants ===
In his works on the Missale Speciale, Stevenson addressed the relationship between the presence of specific watermarked paper and the date of printing, and developed the principle of "runs and remnants". Many bibliographers had argued that the fact that a watermark in a book whose date is in question also appears in a book with a specific date gives no indication (other than a terminal date) for the printing of the undated book because the printer of the dated book could have used old paper which he or someone else had held for many years. Stevenson observed that, while an individual might hold on to a supply of writing paper for a number of years, a printer, for whom the cost of paper for books was his largest capital investment, would ordinarily use paper soon after it was purchased. In fact, "As a rule a particular lot of paper seems to have been obtained and set out for a particular job." Where there is a run of paper with a specific watermark, as opposed to an isolated sheet or two, that should indicate that the book was printed shortly after the paper was manufactured and purchased. In contrast, the presence of a single or few sheets with a particular watermark (a "remnant") might reflect an older paper used, and not be indicative of the actual printing date of a book. Stevenson confirmed this principle by identifying numerous examples of the same watermarks in the Missale Speciale in other dated or datable incunables, the deteriorating states of which fit the chronology of the known dates of the books.

=== Block books ===
Block books are undated short religious books in which both the text and illustrations were printed from a single woodcut block. In part because of their sometimes crude appearance, it was widely believed that block books dated to the first half of the 15th century and were precursors to printing by movable metal type, invented by Gutenberg in the early 1450s. Written notations of purchase and rubrication dates, however, led some scholars to believe that the books had been printed later. In the mid-1960s, Stevenson began an extensive study of block books. Stevenson, however, suffered illness in his later years and never completed that project. In 1967, he published an introduction to his study, and years after his death, a draft of his work was published as "The Problem of the Blockbooks", based on an unfinished typescript from 1965–66. By comparing the watermarks in the paper used in block books with watermarks in dated documents, he concluded that the "heyday" of block books was the 1460s, but that at least one dated from about 1451. He also determined that block books were frequently reprinted, and that the different reprints or "impressions" may be distinguished, and dated, by the different paper used to print them.

== Appreciation ==
During his life, Stevenson achieved little formal academic recognition, taking twenty years to get his doctorate and never obtaining tenure as a professor. His teaching career ended in 1952, and he was thereafter "unaffiliated". He is seen, however, as a major figure in the history of bibliography for his groundbreaking work on watermarks and their uses, and his Problem of the Missale Speciale has been called a "bibliographical masterpiece".

Stevenson's writing style has been highly praised for its "sheer pleasure and vitality" and he has been called "a lord of language". Stevenson also is known for his sense of humor. In a highly technical study of early printing, for example, he gives the twin bull's head watermarks names like "Wideface" and "Squareface", using "Dick Tracy lingo", and then playfully traces them through various incunables as they deteriorate and "age":

"Wideface and his brother gaze blandly forth from the 16-mm. window between [the type columns] ... finally I come upon these amiable oxen in a dated book. ... [In a late state of the stock,] These old fellows, full of agues and distempers, have been pressed into service long after they should have laid down their burdens...."

Stevenson's working papers and notes are held at Princeton University's Firestone Library and at the Fondren Library at Rice University, which also holds Stevenson's collection of books on the history of paper and watermarks, donated by his wife in 1986.

== Bibliography ==
- "Shirley's Years in Ireland", The Review of English Studies, Oxford University Press, Vol. 77 (1944), pp. 19–28.
- — (1948). "New Uses of Watermarks as Bibliographical Evidence". Papers of the Bibliographical Society, University of Virginia. 1: 149–182. doi:10.2307/40368928. ISSN 2153-3857. JSTOR 40368928.
- A Critical Study of Heawood's Watermarks, PBSA vol. 45 (1951), pp. 23–36.
- "Watermarks are Twins", Studies in Bibliography, The Bibliographical Society of the University of Virginia, vol. 4 (1951-52), pp. 57-91.
- — (1951). "Shakespearian Dated Watermarks". Studies in Bibliography. 4: 159–164. ISSN 0081-7600. JSTOR 40371098.
- — (1954). "Chain-Indentations in Paper as Evidence". Studies in Bibliography. 6: 181–195. ISSN 0081-7600. JSTOR 40371128.
- "Briquet and the future of paper studies," Introduction to Briquet's Opuscula, Hilversum (1955), pp. xv-l.
- "The Case of the Decapitated Cast or The Night-walker at Smock Alley", Shakespeare Quarterly, Folger Shakespeare Library & George Washington University, Vol. 6, No. 3 (Summer, 1955), pp. 275–296.
- Observations on Paper as Evidence, University of Kansas, Lawrence, Kansas (1961).
- "A Bibliographical Method for the Description of Botanical Books", in Catalogue of Botanical Books in the Collection of Rachel McMasters Miller Hunt, compiled by Allan Stevenson, Pittsburgh (1961), part 1, pp. cxli-ccxl.
- "Paper Evidence and the Missale Speciale, Gutenberg-Jahrbuch (1962), pp. 95-105.
- "Paper as Bibliographical Evidence", The Library, 5th ser. 17, pp. 197–212 (1962).
- "The Quincentennial of Netherlandish Blockbooks", London: British Museum Quarterly, vol. 31, nos. 3-4 (Spring 1967), pp. 83-87.
- The Problem of the Missale Speciale, London: The Bibliographical Society (1967).
- — (1967). "Tudor Roses from John Tate". Studies in Bibliography. 20: 15–34. ISSN 0081-7600. JSTOR 40371437.
- "Beta-radiography and Paper Research", in International Congress of Paper Historians - Communications, vol. 7, pp. 159–68 (1967).
- Introduction to C. M. Briquet, Les Filigranes: Dictionnaire Historique des Marques du Papier Dés Leur Apparition vers 1282 jusqu'en 1600, Amsterdam: Paper Publications Society (1968).
- "The First Printed Book at Louvain", in D.E. Rhodes (ed.), Essays in Honour of Victor Scholderer, Mainz (1970), pp. 229–262.
- "The Problem of the Blockbooks," in Sabine Mertens et al., Blockbücher des Mittelalters, Mainz (1991), pp. 229-262, based on a typewritten text from 1965-1966.
