= Rudolf Horvat =

Croatian historian (1873–1947)

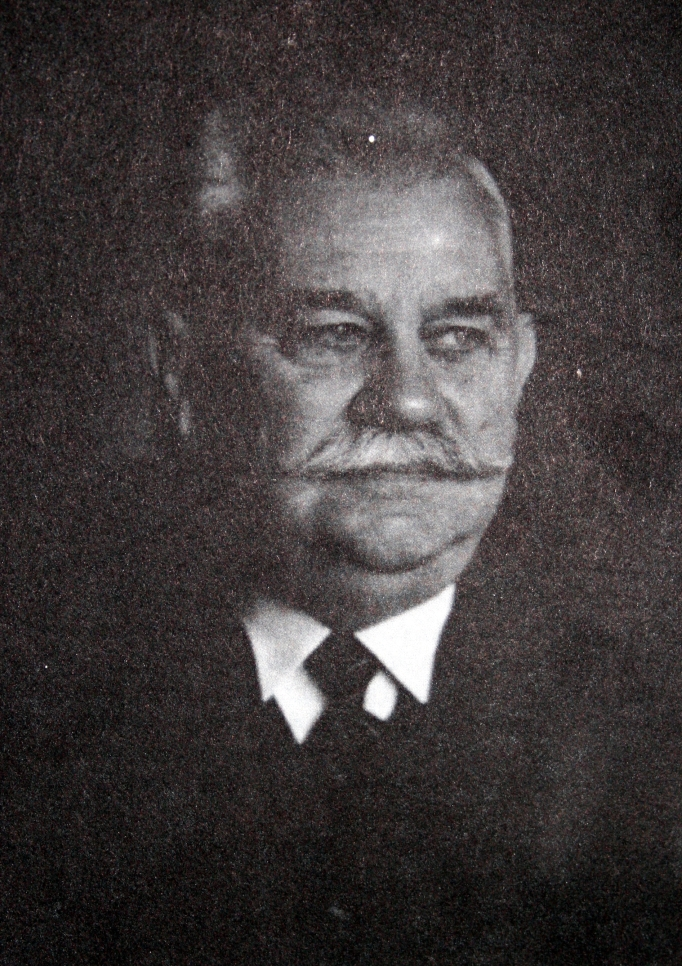
- Born: 14 March 1873; Koprivnica, Kingdom of Croatia-Slavonia, Austria-Hungary (now Croatia)
- Died: 25 May 1947 (aged 74); Zagreb, People's Republic of Croatia, Federal People's Republic of Yugoslavia
- Education: University of Zagreb
- Occupation: Historian
- Political party: Croatian Peasant Party

Rudolf Horvat (14 March 1873 – 25 May 1947) was a Croatian historian.

Horvat was born in Koprivnica, and graduated from the University of Zagreb in history and geography in 1896, as well as law in 1918. He worked as a history teacher at the Real Gymnasium Osijek, and in Zemun, Petrinja and Zagreb secondary schools before and during the World War I. During the war, Horvat was accused of being sympathetic to the Kingdom of Serbia and briefly detained in Hungary in response. After the establishment of the new South Slavic state, the Kingdom of Serbs, Croats and Slovenes (later renamed Yugoslavia), Horvat was forced to retire from teaching due to his criticism of the coat of arms of the new kingdom. In the early 1920s, Horvat was an associate of the Croatian Peasant Party (HSS) leader Stjepan Radić, elected to the national parliament on the HSS party list of candidates in 1920 and 1923. He resigned his post after the HSS joined the Krestintern. In 1926, Horvat resumed teaching history in Zagreb for another four years, until he came into conflict with Yugoslav authorities. He published daily articles in the Jutarnji list paper in 1932–1940 and established the Hrvatski rodoljub (lit. Croatian Patriot) historical society in Zagreb in 1937. Horvat also published the journal Hrvatska prošlost (lit. Croatian Past) in 1940–1943. During the existence of the Axis puppet state of Independent State of Croatia (1941–1945), Horvat resumed his teaching career, including at the Faculty of Philosophy of the University of Zagreb. After the defeat of the Axis powers, Horvat was indicted for the positions he expressed in his article Ljetopis Hrvatske 1918. do 1942. (lit. Annals of Croatia 1918–1942), convicted and sentenced to ten years of loss of political and civil rights. He died in Zagreb.
