= Bakovčica =

Coordinates: 46°07′15″N 16°51′30″E

- Village
- Interactive map of Bakovčica
- Country: Croatia
- County: Koprivnica-Križevci County

Area
  - Total: 8.0 km^{2} (3.1 sq mi)

Population (2021)
  - Total: 295
  - Density: 37/km^{2} (96/sq mi)
- Time zone: UTC+1 (CET)
  - Summer (DST): UTC+2 (CEST)

Bakovčica is a village in Croatia. It is connected by the D2 highway.
