= Red letter =

Red letter is an English language idiom that may refer to:

- A red letter day, an important occasion, festival, or anniversary
- A red letter edition, usually of the Bible, with portions of the text written in red ink
- Red-Letter Christians, a movement named for the words attributed to Jesus in red letter editions of the Bible
- Red Letter Media, a film production company
- Red Letter (2025 film), an Indian Hindi-language film

== See also ==
- rubric
