= 31-line Indulgence =

Earliest known movable-type printed document

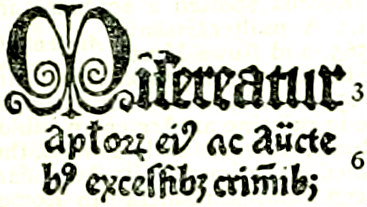
An excerpt from an early printed page. Gothic type. From a 31-line Indulgence, presumably printed by Johan Gutenberg at Mainz (from the Göttingen copy).

The 31-line Indulgence is a plenary indulgence granted by Pope Nicholas V and issued in Erfurt on 22 October 1454. It is the earliest known European document with a fixed date printed by movable metal type, which had recently been introduced in Europe by Johannes Gutenberg. One of 46 surviving copies is preserved in the Scheide Library at Princeton.

== Background ==
Indulgences were sold by the Roman Catholic Church as "a way to reduce the amount of punishment one has to undergo for sins". To assist the defiance of Cyprus against a Turkish invasion, Pope Nicholas V granted all income from the sale of the Indulgences to John II, King of Cyprus. The order was issued on 12 April 1451. On 6 January 1452, John II appointed as his commissary Paulinus Zappe or Chappe, a Cypriot nobleman and the Proctor-General of the king. The indulgence was valid between 1 May 1452 and 30 April 1455.

== History ==
The Indulgence does not give any indication as to printer or place of printing but it is assumed Gutenberg printed the document given it was printed using the D-K type and the proximity of Erfurt to Mainz (D-K type was used by Gutenberg and Mainz, where he manufactured his printing press, is only 30 miles from Erfurt). The Gesamtkatalog der Wiegendrucke attributes the 31-line Indulgence to the "Printer of the 36-line Bible", assumed to be Gutenberg. There were at least two rival printers also printing in Mainz at the time and one of the discrepancies that may lend evidence that Gutenberg did not print the document is the distinct difference of the typeface on the Indulgence from that of the Gutenberg Bible, printed by Gutenberg.

The year 1454 is printed on the document using movable type, with a blank space on lines 18 through 21 where the month, day and name of the person who purchased the indulgence is filled in by hand.

The copy in the Scheide Library was issued in Pfullendorf on 29 April 1455 to Johannes Grosshans of Schaffhausen. It was preserved in the library of the Cistercians of Salem as pastedowns in a binding on four incunables. After the dissolution of the library, possession transferred to a convent. In the early 19th century was sold to Heidelberg University. The university removed and sold the indulgence as a duplicate around 1930 to Maggs Brothers, which sold it to John H. Scheide in November 1933. It was incorporated into the library that was founded in his name.

== Sources ==
- Wagner, Bettina; Reed, Marcia (2010). Early Printed Books as Material Objects: Proceedings of the Conference Organized by the IFLA Rare Books and Manuscripts Section, Munich, 19-21 August 2009. Walter de Gruyter.
- Hessels, John Henry (1911). "Typography" . In Chisholm, Hugh (ed.). Encyclopædia Britannica. Vol. 27 (11th ed.). Cambridge University Press. pp. 509–548.
