= Gutenberg Bible =

Earliest major book printed in Europe

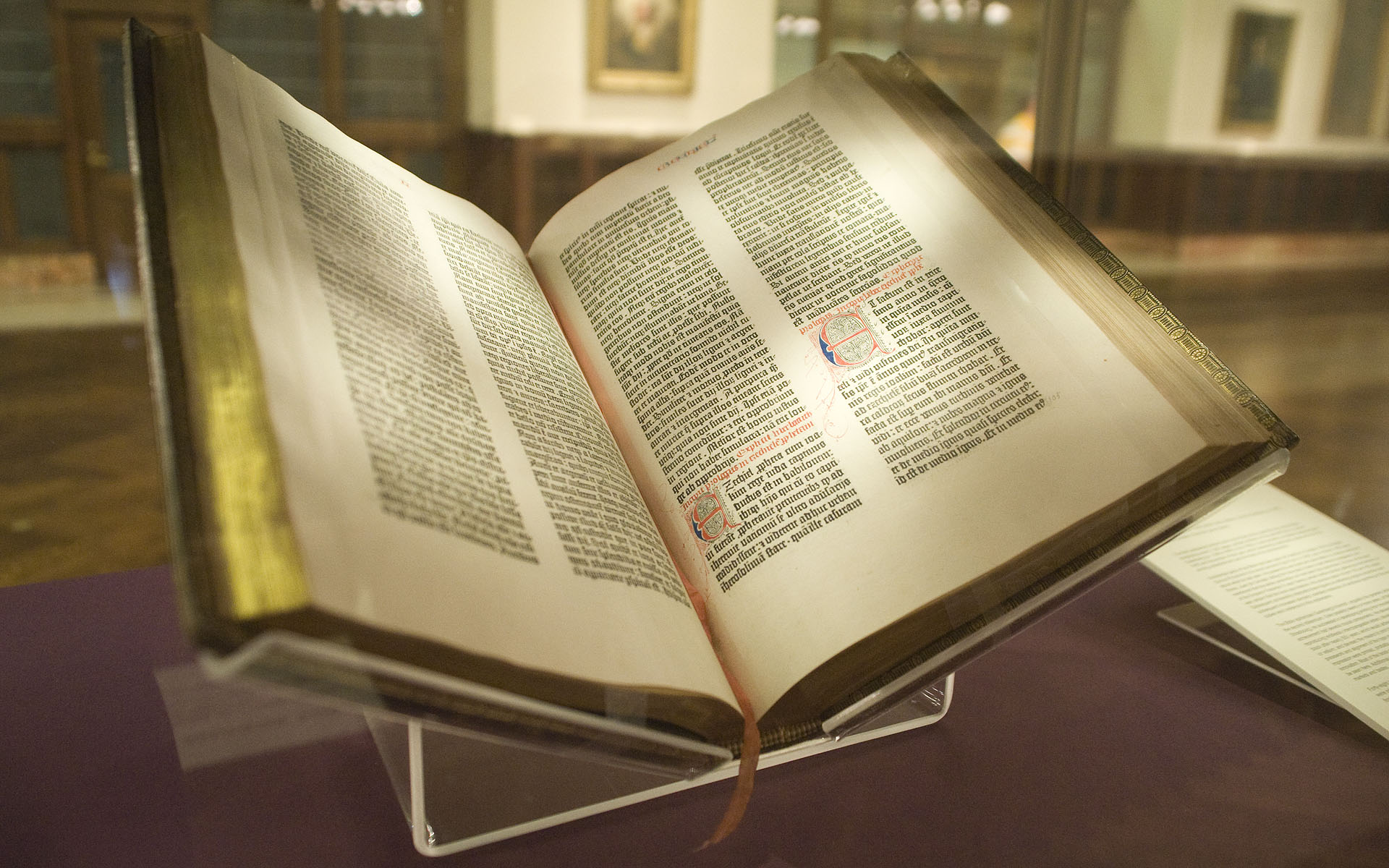
Gutenberg Bible of the New York Public Library; purchased by James Lenox in 1847, it was the first Gutenberg Bible to be acquired by a United States citizen.

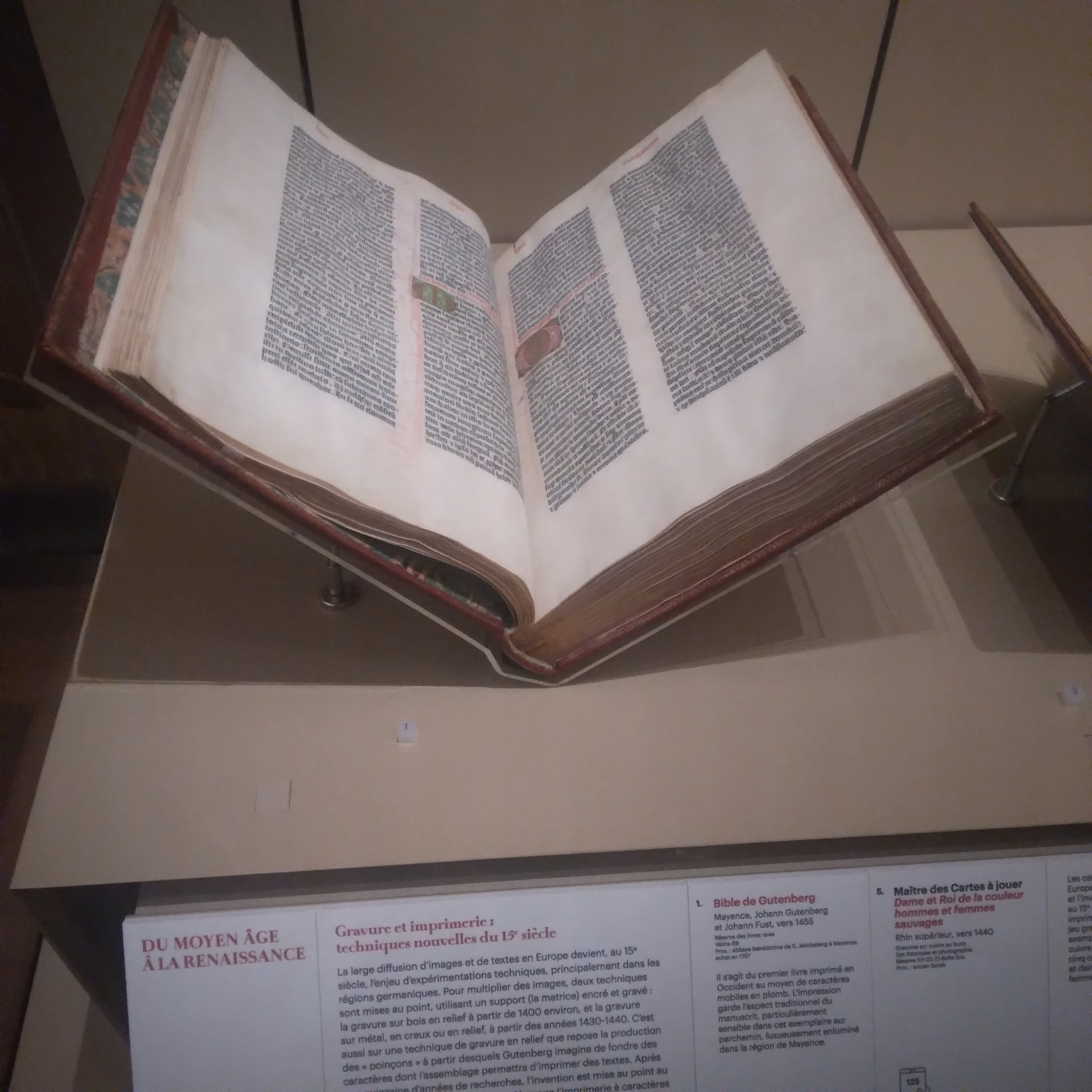
The copy of the Gutenberg Bible held at the Bibliothèque nationale de France

The Gutenberg Bible, also known as the 42-line Bible, the Mazarin Bible or the B42, is the earliest major book printed in Europe using mass-produced metal movable type. It marked the start of the "Gutenberg Revolution" and the age of printed books in the West. The book is valued and revered for its high aesthetic and artistic qualities and its historical significance.

The Gutenberg Bible is an edition of the Latin Vulgate printed in the 1450s by Johannes Gutenberg in Mainz (Holy Roman Empire), in present-day Germany. Out of either 158 or 180 copies that were originally printed, 49 survive in at least substantial portion, 21 of them in entirety; of these, the copy with the earliest visible print date is marked as 15 August 1456. They are thought to be among the world's most valuable books, although no complete copy has been sold since 1978. In March 1455, the future Pope Pius II wrote that he had seen pages from the Gutenberg Bible, displayed in Frankfurt to promote the edition.

The 36-line Bible, said to be the second printed Bible, is also sometimes referred to as a Gutenberg Bible, but may be the work of another printer.

== Text ==
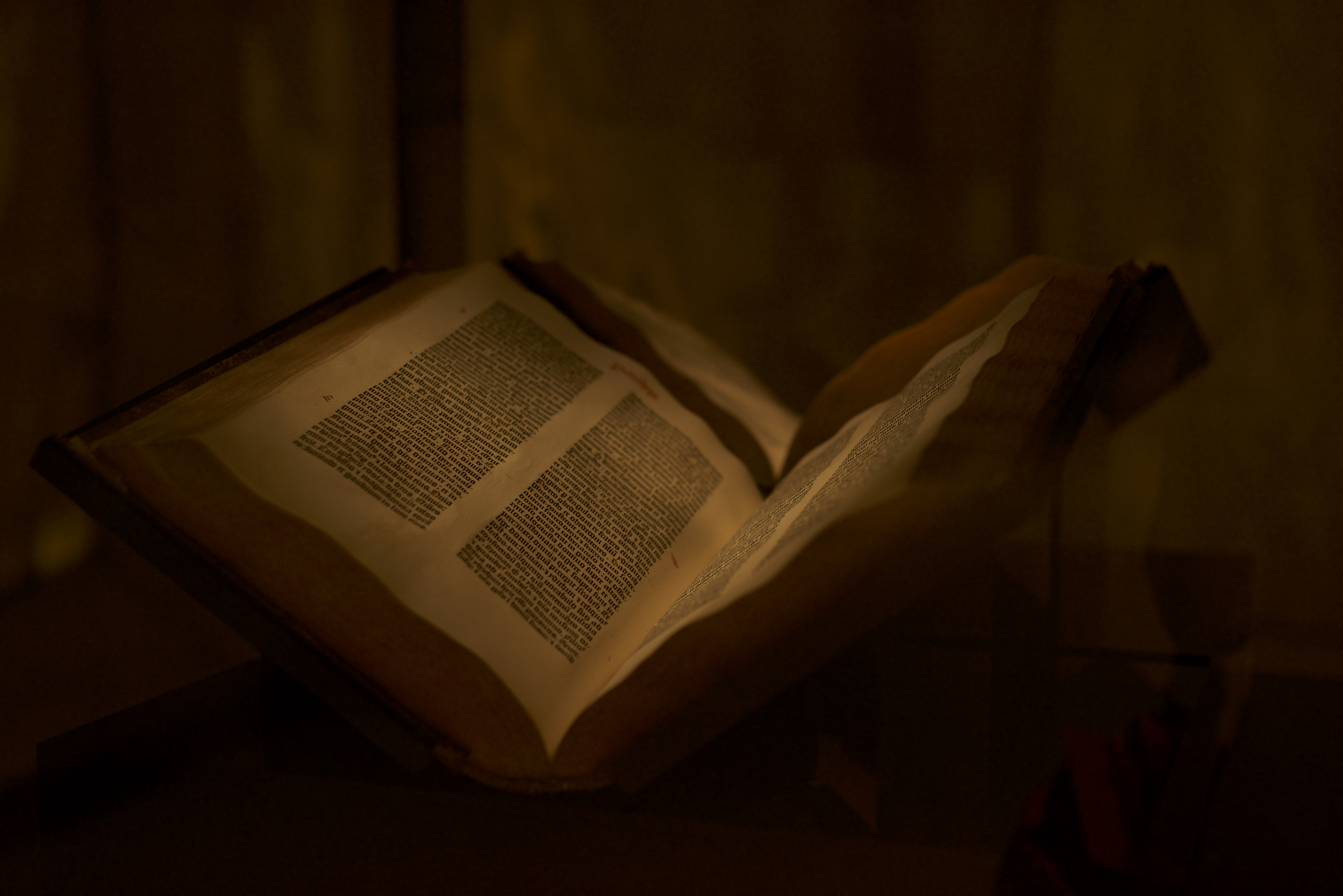
Gutenberg Bible in the Beinecke Rare Book & Manuscript Library at Yale University in New Haven, Connecticut

The Gutenberg Bible is an edition of the Vulgate, a Latin translation of the Hebrew Bible (Old Testament) and the Greek New Testament by St Jerome. The text contains emendations from the Parisian Bible tradition, and further divergences.

== Printing history ==
While it is unlikely that any of Gutenberg's early publications would bear his name, the initial expense of press equipment and materials and of the work to be done before the Bible was ready for sale suggests that he may have started with more lucrative texts, including several religious documents, a German poem, and some editions of Aelius Donatus's Ars Grammatica, a popular Latin grammar school book.

Preparation of the Bible probably began soon after 1450, and the first finished copies were available in 1454 or 1455. It is not known exactly how long the Bible took to print. The first precisely datable printing is Gutenberg's 31-line Indulgence which certainly existed by 22 October 1454.

Gutenberg made three significant changes during the printing process. Each sheet of paper was dampened before printing to improve ink absorption. It was then pressed onto an inked surface consisting of moveable type. After each sheet was printed, the type was re-inked, and the process repeated until the entire print run was completed. Once finished, the type was cleaned and redistributed into type cases for future use. This method is a form of relief printing.

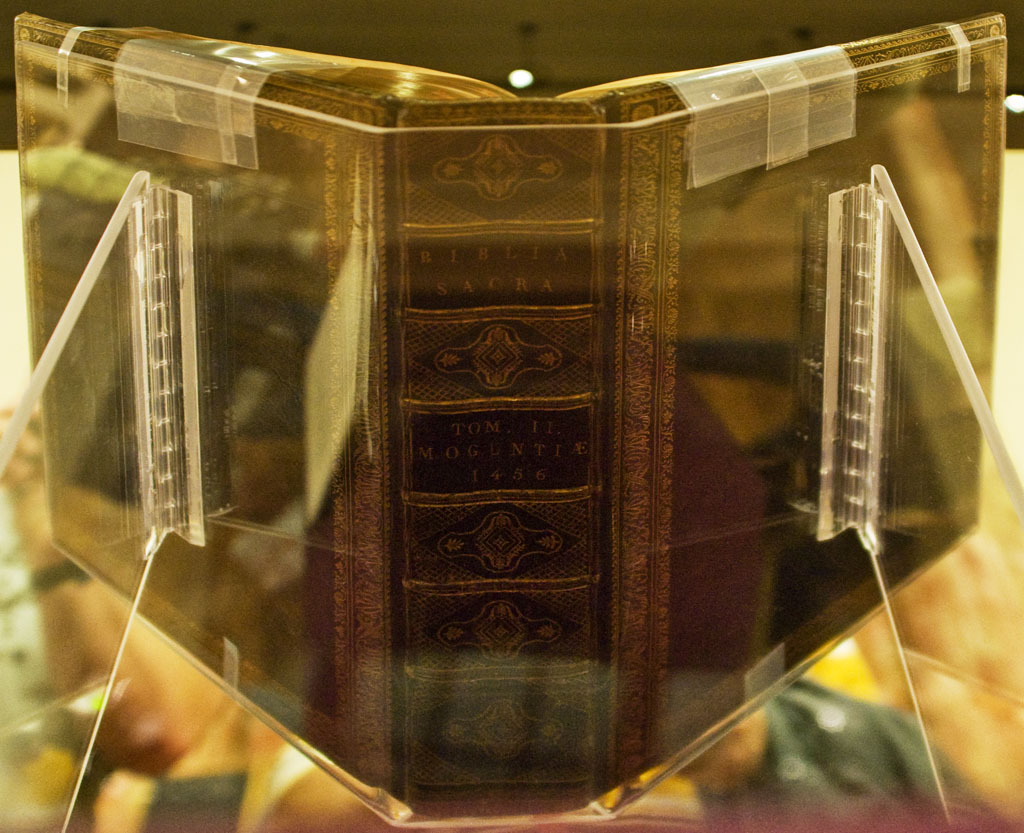
Spine of the Lenox copy

Some time later, after more sheets had been printed, the number of lines per page was increased from 40 to 42, presumably to save paper. Therefore, pages 1 to 9 and pages 256 to 265, presumably the first ones printed, have 40 lines each. Page 10 has 41, and from there on the 42 lines appear. The increase in line number was achieved by decreasing the interline spacing, rather than increasing the printed area of the page. Finally, the print run was increased, necessitating resetting those pages which had already been printed. The new sheets were all reset to 42 lines per page. Consequently, there are two distinct settings in folios 1–32 and 129–158 of volume I and folios 1–16 and 162 of volume II.

The most reliable information about the Bible's date comes from a letter. In March 1455, the future Pope Pius II wrote that he had seen pages from the Gutenberg Bible, being displayed to promote the edition, in Frankfurt. It is not known how many copies were printed, with the 1455 letter citing sources for both 158 and 180 copies. Scholars today think that examination of surviving copies suggests that somewhere between 160 and 185 copies were printed, with about three-quarters on paper and the others on vellum.

== The production process: Das Werk der Bücher ==
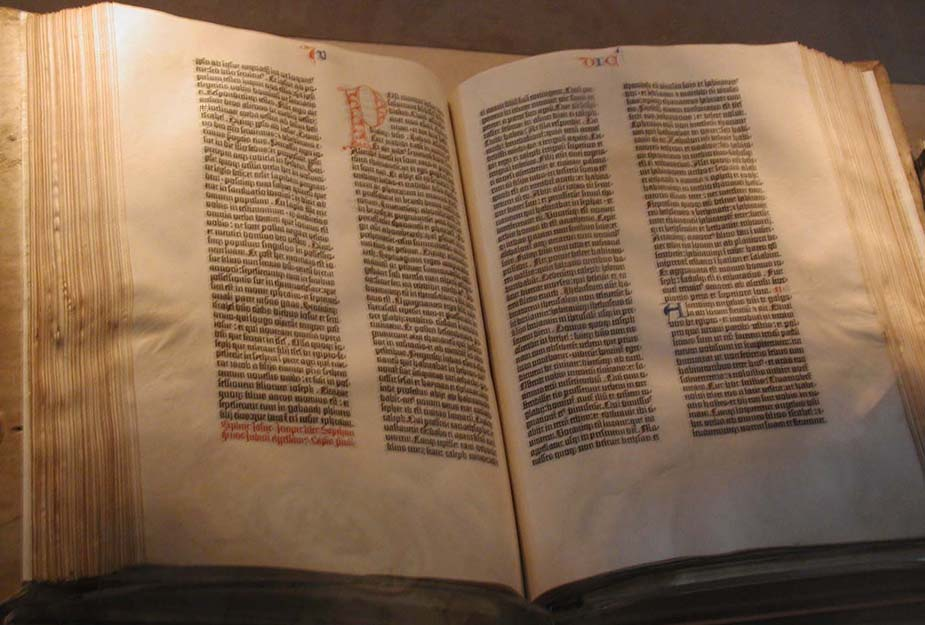
A vellum copy of the Gutenberg Bible owned by the U.S. Library of Congress, on display at the Thomas Jefferson Building in Washington, D.C.

In a legal paper, written after completion of the Bible, Johannes Gutenberg refers to the process as Das Werk der Bücher ("the work of the books"). He had introduced the printing press to Europe and created the technology to make printing with movable types finally efficient enough to facilitate the mass production of entire books.

Many book-lovers have commented on the high standards achieved in the production of the Gutenberg Bible, some describing it as one of the most beautiful books ever printed. The quality of both the ink and other materials and the printing itself have been noted.

=== Pages ===
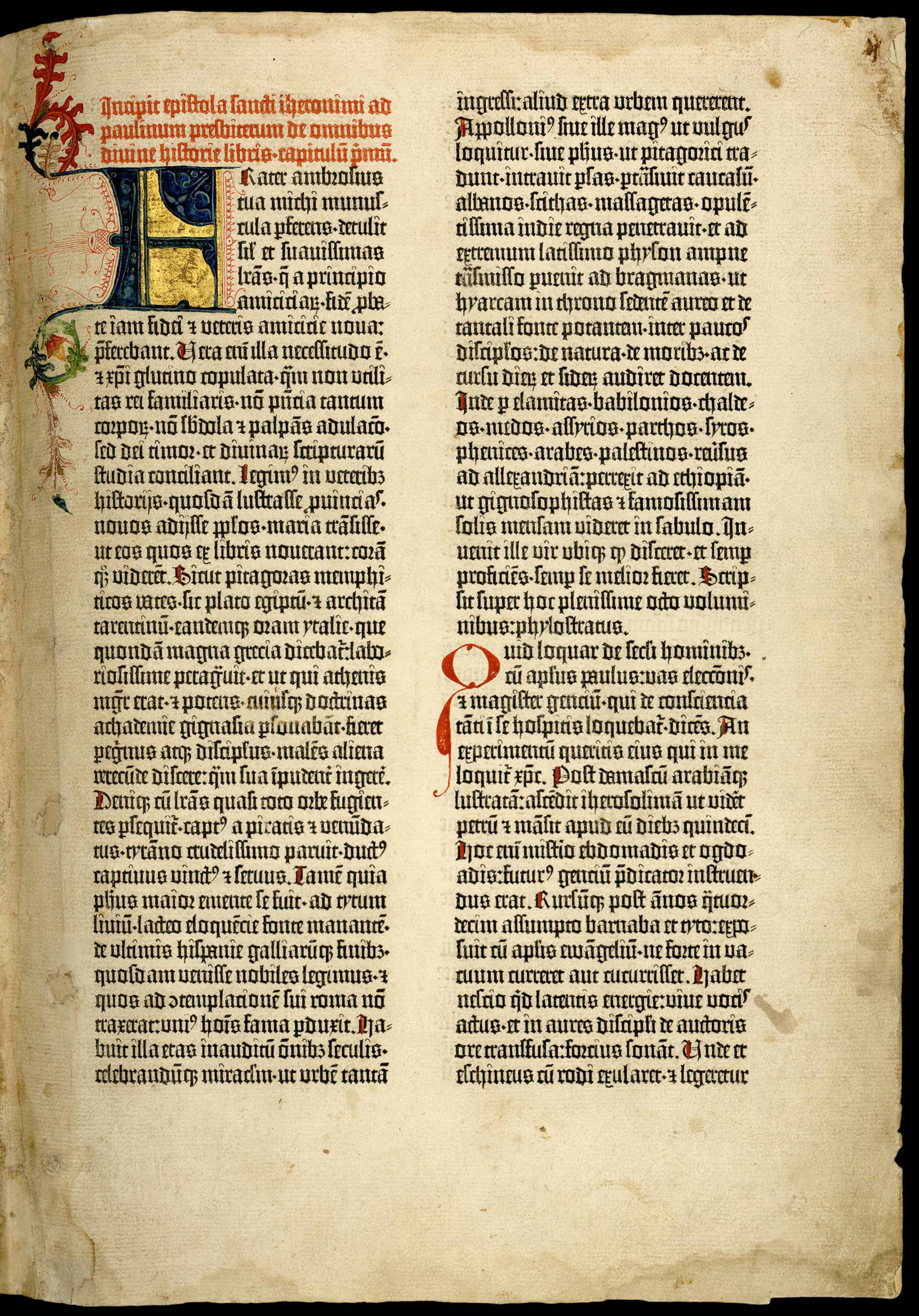
First page of the first volume: the epistle of St Jerome to Paulinus from the University of Texas copy. The page has 40 lines.

The paper size is 'double folio', with two pages printed on each side (four pages per sheet). After printing the paper was folded once to the size of a single page. Typically, five of these folded sheets (ten leaves, or twenty printed pages) were combined to a single physical section, called a quinternion, that could then be bound into a book. Some sections, however, had as few as four leaves or as many as twelve leaves.

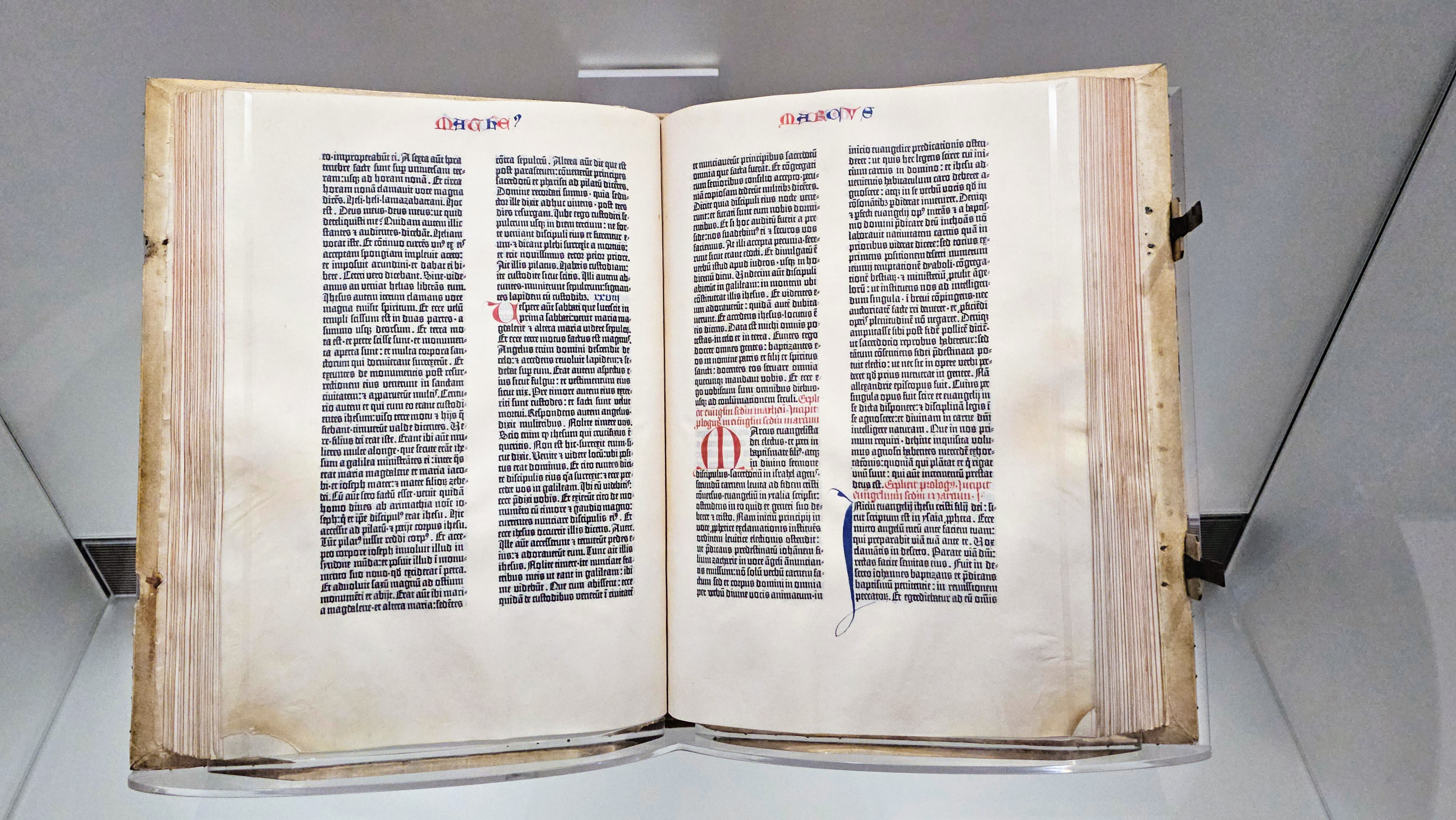
Gutenberg Bible on display at the U.S. Library of Congress

The 42-line Bible was printed on the size of paper known as 'Royal'. A full sheet of Royal paper measures 42 cm × 60 cm (17 in × 24 in) and a single untrimmed folio leaf measures 42 cm × 30 cm (17 in × 12 in). There have been attempts to claim that the book was printed on larger paper measuring 44.5 cm × 30.7 cm (17.5 in × 12.1 in), but this assertion is contradicted by the dimensions of existing copies. For example, the leaves of the copy in the Bodleian Library, Oxford, measure 40 cm × 28.6 cm (15.7 in × 11.3 in). This is typical of other folio Bibles printed on Royal paper in the fifteenth century. Most fifteenth-century printing papers have a width-to-height ratio of 1:1.4 (e.g. 30:42 cm) which, mathematically, is a ratio of 1 to the square root of 2 or, simply, $\sqrt{2}$. Many suggest that this ratio was chosen to match the so-called Golden Ratio, $\tfrac{1+\sqrt{5}}{2}$, of 1:1.6; in fact the ratios are, plainly, not at all similar (equating to a difference of about 12 per cent). The ratio of 1:1.4 was a long established one for medieval paper sizes. A single complete copy of the Gutenberg Bible has 1,288 pages (4×322 = 1288) (usually bound in two volumes); with four pages per folio-sheet, 322 sheets of paper are required per copy. The Bible's paper consists of linen fibres and is thought to have been imported from Caselle in Piedmont, Italy based on the watermarks present throughout the volume.

=== Ink ===
In Gutenberg's time, inks used by scribes to produce manuscripts were water-based. Gutenberg developed an oil-based ink that would better adhere to his metal type. His ink was primarily carbon, but also had a high metallic content, with copper, lead, and titanium predominating. Head of collections at the British Library, Kristian Jensen, described it thus: "if you look [at the pages of The Gutenberg Bible] closely you will see this is a very shiny surface. When you write you use a water-based ink, you put your pen into it and it runs off. Now if you print that's exactly what you don't want. One of Gutenberg's inventions was an ink which wasn't ink, it's a varnish. So what we call printer's ink is actually a varnish, and that means it sticks to its surface."

=== Type ===
Each unique character requires a piece of master type in order to be replicated. Given that each letter has uppercase and lowercase forms, and the number of various punctuation marks and ligatures (e.g., "ﬁ" for the letter sequence "fi", commonly used in writing), the Gutenberg Bible needed a set of 290 master characters. It seems probable that six pages, containing 15,600 characters altogether, would be set at any one moment.

=== Type style ===
The Gutenberg Bible is printed in the blackletter type styles that would become known as Textualis (Textura) and Schwabacher. The name Textura refers to the texture of the printed page: straight vertical strokes combined with horizontal lines, giving the impression of a woven structure. Gutenberg already used the technique of justification, that is, creating a vertical, not indented, alignment at the left and right-hand sides of the column. To do this, he used various methods, including using characters of narrower widths, adding extra spaces around punctuation, and varying the widths of spaces around words.

=== Rubrication, illumination and binding ===
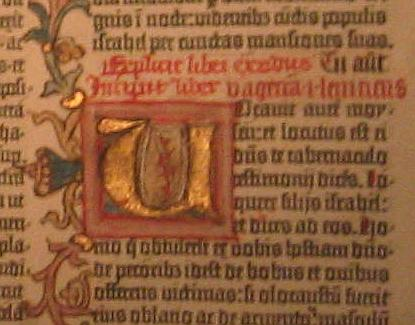
Detail showing both rubrication (text in red) and illumination

Initially the rubrics—the headings before each book of the Bible—were printed, but this practice was quickly abandoned at an unknown date, and gaps were left for rubrication to be added by hand. A guide of the text to be added to each page, printed for use by rubricators, survives.

The spacious margin allowed illuminated decoration to be added by hand. The amount of decoration presumably depended on how much each buyer could or would pay. Some copies were never decorated. The place of decoration can be known or inferred for about 30 of the surviving copies. It is possible that 13 of these copies received their decoration in Mainz, but others were worked on as far away as London. The vellum Bibles were more expensive, and perhaps for this reason tend to be more highly decorated, although the vellum copy in the British Library is completely undecorated.

There has been speculation that the "Master of the Playing Cards", an unidentified engraver who has been called "the first personality in the history of engraving," was partly responsible for the illumination of the copy held by the Princeton University library. However, all that can be said for certain is that the same model book was used for some of the illustrations in this copy and for some of the Master's illustrated playing cards.

Although many Gutenberg Bibles have been rebound over the years, nine copies retain fifteenth-century bindings. Most of these copies were bound in either Mainz or Erfurt. Most copies were divided into two volumes, the first volume ending with The Book of Psalms. Copies on vellum were heavier and for this reason were sometimes bound in three or four volumes.

== Early owners ==
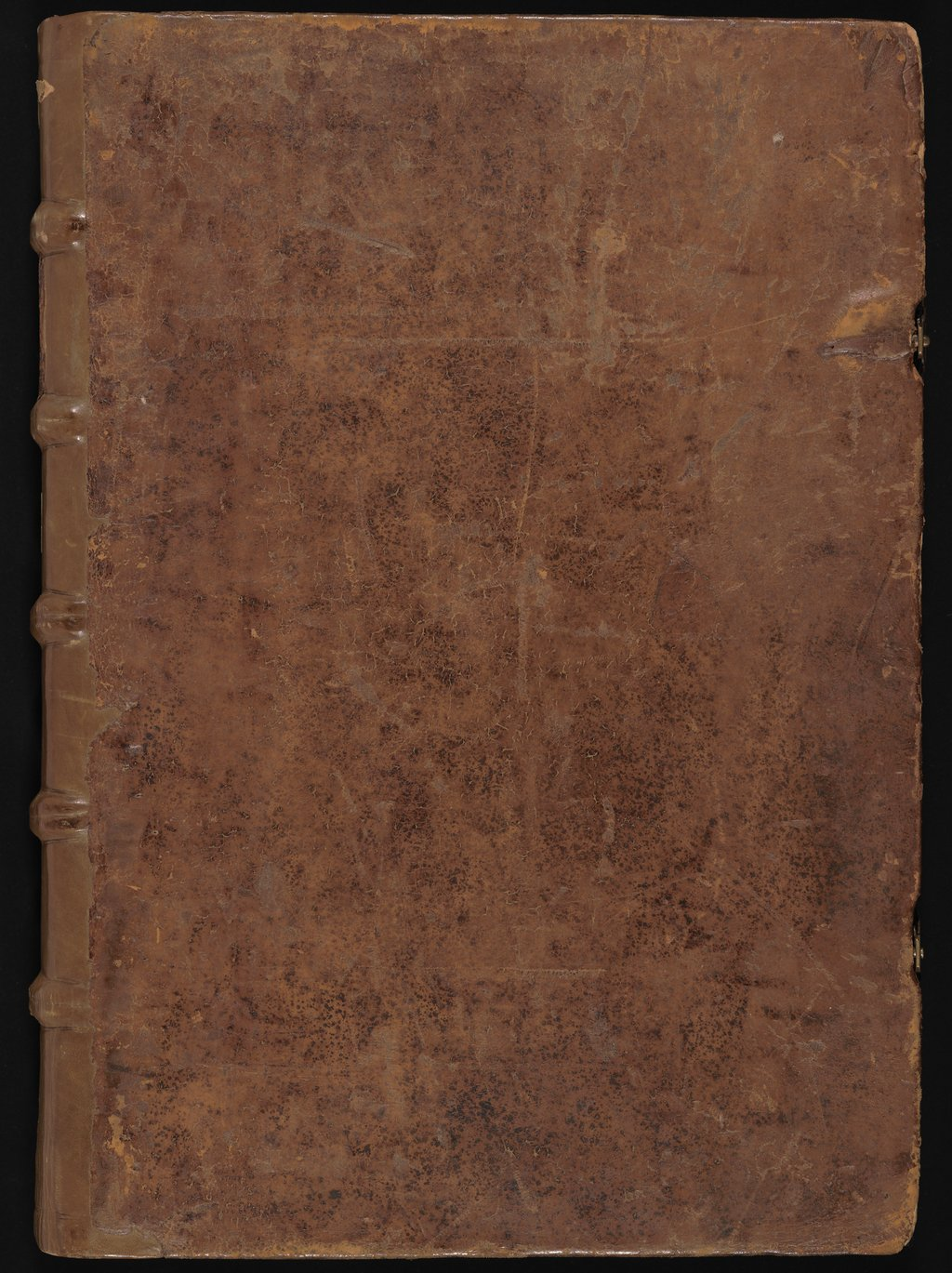
Binding of the copy at the Bavarian State Library, one of the few Gutenberg Bibles to retain their original bindings.

The Bible seems to have sold out immediately, with some initial purchases as far away as England and possibly Sweden and Hungary. At least some copies are known to have sold for 30 florins (equivalent to about 100 grams or 3.5 ounces of gold), which was about three years' wages for a clerk. Although this made them significantly cheaper than manuscript Bibles, most students, priests or other people of moderate income would not have been able to afford them. It is assumed that most were sold to monasteries, universities and particularly wealthy individuals. At present only one copy is known to have been privately owned in the fifteenth century. Some are known to have been used for communal readings in monastery refectories; others may have been for display rather than use, and a few were certainly used for study. Kristian Jensen suggests that many copies were bought by wealthy and pious laymen for donation to religious institutions.

== Influence on later Bibles ==
The Gutenberg Bible had a profound effect on the history of the printed book. Textually, it also had an influence on future editions of the Bible. It provided the model for several later editions, including the 36 Line Bible, Mentelin's Latin Bible, and the first and third Eggestein Bibles. The third Eggestein Bible was set from the copy of the Gutenberg Bible now in Cambridge University Library. The Gutenberg Bible also had an influence on the Clementine edition of the Vulgate commissioned by the Papacy in the late sixteenth century.

== Forgeries ==
Fragment of the Gutenberg Bible that was used as binding waste, now held by the Basel University Library.

Joseph Martini, a New York book dealer, found that the Gutenberg Bible held by the library of the General Theological Seminary in New York had a forged leaf, carrying part of Chapter 14, all of Chapter 15, and part of Chapter 16 of the Book of Ezekiel. It was impossible to tell when the leaf had been inserted into the volume. It was replaced in the fall of 1953, when a patron donated the corresponding leaf from a defective Gutenberg second volume which was being broken up and sold in parts. This made it "the first imperfect Gutenberg Bible ever restored to completeness." In 1978, this copy was sold for US$2.2 million to the Württembergische Landesbibliothek in Stuttgart, Germany.

== Surviving copies ==
As of 2009, 49 Gutenberg Bibles are known to exist, but of these only 25 are complete. Others have pages or even whole volumes missing. In addition, there are a substantial number of fragments, some as small as individual leaves, which are likely to represent about another 16 copies. Many of these fragments have survived because they were used as part of the binding of later books.

=== Substantially complete copies ===
List of substantially complete copies

Country	Holding institution	Hubay no.	Length	Material	Notes and external links
Austria (1)	Austrian National Library, Vienna	27	complete	paper	One of only two copies to contain the "tabula rubricarum" (index of rubrics) on four leaves at the end. Obtained from Friedrich Karl Joseph von Erthal in 1793. Online images (in German)
Belgium (1)	Library of the University of Mons-Hainaut, Mons	1	incomplete	paper	Vol. I, 104 leaves missing, bequeathed by Edmond Puissant to the city of Mons in 1934, but not identified until 1950. Part of the same copy as the volume in Indiana (see below).
Denmark (1)	Danish Royal Library, Copenhagen	13	incomplete	paper	Vol. II, first leaf missing. Acquired in 1749.
France (4)	Bibliothèque nationale de France, Paris	15	complete	vellum	Sold to the library in 1788 by Cardinal Étienne Charles de Loménie de Brienne, and rebound in four volumes. Online images of vol. 1 vol. 2 vol. 3 vol. 4
France (4)	Bibliothèque nationale de France, Paris	17	incomplete	paper	Is distinguished by being inscribed with the earliest date that appears on any copy — 24 August 1456 on the first volume and 15 August 1456 on the second volume, the dates on which the rubricator and binder (Henricus Cremer) completed his work. Online images of vol. 1
France (4)	Bibliothèque Mazarine, Paris	16	complete	paper	The first copy to be discovered around 1760 in the Bibliothèque Mazarine (hence the name Mazarin Bible) by Guillaume-François Debure and described in the first volume of his Bibliographie instructive: ou Traite de la connoissance des livres rares et singuliers devoted to theology, which was published in Paris in 1763. Online images of vol. 1 and vol. 2 (in French)
France (4)	Bibliothèque Municipale, Saint-Omer	18	incomplete	paper	Vol. I, one missing leaf. Acquired from the Abbey of Saint Bertin. Online images (in French)
Germany (13)	Gutenberg Museum, Mainz	8	incomplete	paper	The Shuckburgh copy, two volumes but imperfect, sold by Hans P. Kraus for $1.8 million in March 1978. Online images (in German)
Germany (13)	Gutenberg Museum, Mainz	9	incomplete	paper	Vol. II, the Solms-Laubach copy acquired in 1925.
Germany (13)	Hochschul- und Landesbibliothek Fulda, Fulda	4	incomplete	vellum	Vol. I. Two individual leaves from Vol. II survive in other libraries.
Germany (13)	Leipzig University Library, Leipzig	14	incomplete	vellum	Vol. I through IV.
Germany (13)	Göttingen State and University Library, Göttingen	2	complete	vellum	Inscribed in UNESCO's Memory of the World International Register since 2001. Online images
Germany (13)	Berlin State Library, Berlin	3	incomplete	vellum	Online images
Germany (13)	Bavarian State Library, Munich	5	complete	paper	One of only two copies to contain the "tabula rubricarum" (index of rubrics) on four leaves at the end. Also one of three existing copies in its original binding. Online images of vol. 1 and vol. 2 (in German)
Germany (13)	Frankfurt University Library, Frankfurt am Main	6	complete	paper	Online images
Germany (13)	Hofbibliothek, Aschaffenburg	7	incomplete	paper	
Germany (13)	Württembergische Landesbibliothek, Stuttgart	10	incomplete	paper	Purchased in April 1978 for US$2.2 million from the General Theological Seminary. Online images
Germany (13)	Stadtbibliothek, Trier	11	incomplete	paper	Vol. I
Germany (13)	Landesbibliothek, Kassel	12	incomplete	paper	Vol. I
Germany (13)	Gottorf Castle, Schleswig	47	incomplete	paper	The Rendsburg Fragment
Japan (1)	Keio University Library, Tokyo	45	incomplete	paper	Originally part of the Estelle Doheny bequest to St. John's Seminary in Camarillo, California. Vol. I, sold in October 1987 to Maruzen booksellers for US$4.9 million (plus an auction house commission of $490,000) for a total of $5.4 million. Purchased by Keio University in 1996. Online images
Poland (1)	Diocesan Museum in Pelplin	28	incomplete	paper	It has a blot on page 46 and it lacks a page 217 in Volume Two.
Portugal (1)	Biblioteca Nacional de Portugal, Lisbon	29	complete	paper	Formerly owned by Cardinal Étienne Charles de Loménie de Brienne. Online images.
Russia (2)	Moscow State University, Moscow	49	complete	paper	Looted in 1945 from the library of the University of Leipzig.
Russia (2)	Russian State Library, Moscow	48	incomplete	vellum	Acquired in 1886 by the German Museum of Books and Writing, Leipzig, as part of the book collection of Heinrich Klemm. At the end of World War II, it was taken as war booty and transferred to the Russian State Library in Moscow, where it remains today.
Spain (2)	Biblioteca Universitaria y Provincial, Seville	32	incomplete	paper	New Testament only Online images (in Spanish)
Spain (2)	Biblioteca Pública Provincial, Burgos	31	complete	paper	Online images
Switzerland (1)	Bodmer Library, Cologny	30	incomplete	paper	
United Kingdom (8)	British Library, London	19	complete	vellum	The Grenville copy. Bought for 6260 francs in 1817 by Thomas Grenville, who bequeathed his collection to the British Museum in 1846. Online images Archived 4 November 2016 at the Wayback Machine
United Kingdom (8)	British Library, London	21	complete	paper	Online images Archived 4 November 2016 at the Wayback Machine
United Kingdom (8)	National Library of Scotland, Edinburgh	26	complete	paper	Online images
United Kingdom (8)	Lambeth Palace Library, London	20	incomplete	vellum	New Testament only
United Kingdom (8)	Eton College Library, Eton College	23	complete	paper	Printed in Mainz with the original 15th Century Erfurt binding, stamped calfskin, signed by Johannes Vogel. Donated by John Fuller (1757–1834). Belonged in the 15th century to the Carthusians at Erfurt. Only copy to retain the original binding in both volumes and is complete. Also one of three existing copies in its original binding. Also the only copy with the original binding to be signed with the binders mark. Illuminated copy, probably in Erfurt.
United Kingdom (8)	John Rylands Library, Manchester	25	complete	paper	Acquired for £80 by George Spencer, 2nd Earl Spencer some time before 1814, Enriqueta Augustina Rylands bought it in 1892 for the John Rylands Library. Online images of 11 pages
United Kingdom (8)	Bodleian Library, Oxford	24	complete	paper	Bought in 1793 for £100 from Cardinal Étienne Charles de Loménie de Brienne. Online images of vol. 1 and vol. 2
United Kingdom (8)	Cambridge University Library, Cambridge	22	complete	paper	Acquired as part of a gift in 1933. Online images of vol. 1 and vol. 2
United States (11)	The Morgan Library & Museum, New York	37	complete	vellum	PML 13 & PML 818. Acquired in 1815 by Mark Masterman-Sykes.
United States (11)	The Morgan Library & Museum, New York	38	complete	paper	PML 19206–7
United States (11)	The Morgan Library & Museum, New York	44	incomplete	paper	PML 1. Old Testament only Online images
United States (11)	Library of Congress, Washington, D.C.	35	complete	vellum	Online images Printed on vellum and bound in three alum-tawed pigskin-covered volumes. On permanent display. Purchased in 1930 with government funds for the Library of Congress. It is the centerpiece of a larger book collection acquired from Dr. Otto Vollbehr.
United States (11)	New York Public Library	42	complete	paper	
United States (11)	Widener Library, Harvard University	40	complete	paper	Online images of selected pages
United States (11)	Beinecke Library, Yale University	41	complete	paper	The Melk copy, a gift from Mrs. Edward Harkness in 1926.
United States (11)	Scheide Library, Princeton University	43	complete	paper	The Brinley-Cole-Ives-Ellsworth-Scheide copy, one of three existing copies in its original binding. Online images
United States (11)	Lilly Library, Indiana University	46	incomplete	paper	New Testament only, 12 leaves missing. Part of the same copy as the volume in Mons, Belgium (see above). Online images
United States (11)	Henry E. Huntington Library, San Marino, California	36	complete	vellum	Purchased in 1911 by Henry Huntington for US$50,000.
United States (11)	Harry Ransom Humanities Research Center, University of Texas at Austin	39	complete	paper	Purchased in 1978 for US$2.4 million. Online images
Vatican City (2)	Vatican Library	33	incomplete	vellum	Online images of vol. 1 and vol. 2
Vatican City (2)	Vatican Library	34	incomplete	paper	Vol. I.

=== Fragments ===
Some fragments of the Gutenberg Bible are housed at:

- The Library of Trinity College Dublin, Dublin, Ireland
- The Basel University Library, Basel, Switzerland
- The British Library, London - known as the Bagford Fragment
- The University of Melbourne, Melbourne, Australia
- The Schiede Library at Princeton University, Princeton, New Jersey, US
- The Rendsberg Fragment at Gottorf Castle, Schleswig, Germany
- The McCune Collection, California, US
- The Clark Library at UCLA, California, US
- The John Carter Brown Library of the Early Americas in Providence, Rhode Island, US
- The Rauner Special Collections Library at Dartmouth College, Hanover, New Hampshire, US
- The National Library of New Zealand, Wellington, New Zealand

Several fragments and single leaves sold at Christie's Auction House or Sotheby's in the 21st century.

== Recent history ==
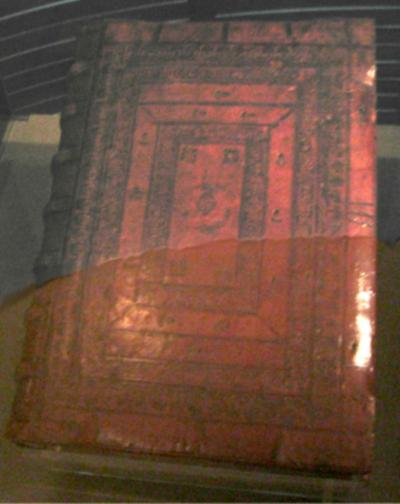
Binding of the copy at the University of Texas at Austin

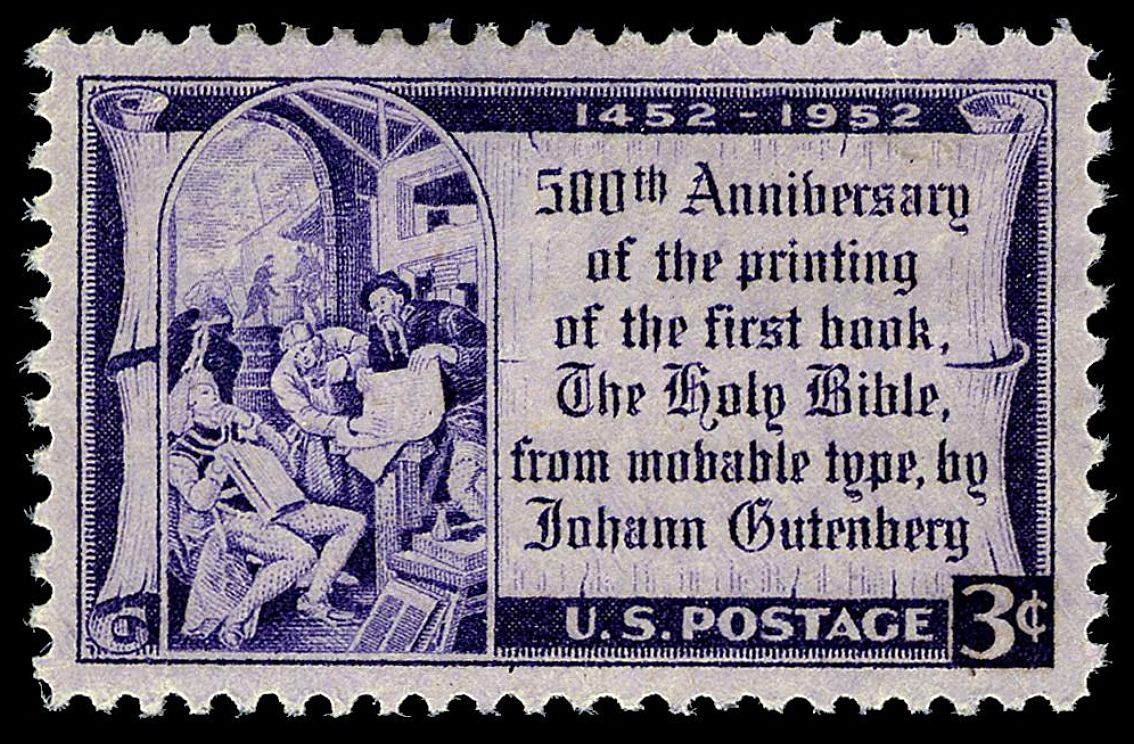
In 1952, the US Post Office issued a commemorative stamp celebrating the 500th anniversary of the first printing of the Bible with moveable type.The stamp depicts an image of Gutenberg showing a proof of his Bible to Adolph of Nassau, Archbishop of Mainz.

Few copies remain in religious institutions, with most now owned by university libraries and other major scholarly institutions. After centuries in which all copies seem to have remained in Europe, the first Gutenberg Bible reached North America in 1847. It is now in the New York Public Library. During the 20th century several long-lost copies were discovered, considerably improving the understanding of how the Bible was produced and distributed. The Morgan Library & Museum in New York holds three copies of the Gutenberg Bible, more than any other institution in the world.

In 1921, a New York rare book dealer, Gabriel Wells, bought a damaged copy, dismantled the book and sold sections and individual leaves to book collectors and libraries. The leaves were sold in a portfolio case with an essay written by A. Edward Newton, and were referred to as "Noble Fragments". In 1953 Charles Scribner's Sons, also book dealers in New York, dismembered a damaged paper copy of volume II. The largest portion of this, the New Testament, is now owned by Indiana University. The leaf carrying part of Chapter 14, all of Chapter 15, and part of Chapter 16 of the Book of Ezekiel was donated to the General Theological Seminary to repair their copy of the bible (now located at the Württembergische Landesbibliothek). The matching first volume of this copy was subsequently discovered in Mons, Belgium, having been bequeathed by Edmond Puissant to the city in 1934.

The only copy held outside Europe and North America is the first volume of a Gutenberg Bible (Hubay 45) at Keio University in Tokyo. The Humanities Media Interface Project (HUMI) at Keio University is known for its high-quality digital images of Gutenberg Bibles and other rare books. Under the direction of Professor Toshiyuki Takamiya, the HUMI team has made digital reproductions of 11 sets of the bible in nine institutions, including both full-text facsimiles held in the collection of the British Library.

The last sale of a complete Gutenberg Bible took place in 1978, which sold for US$2.4 million (equivalent to $9.3 million in 2025). This copy is now in Austin, Texas. The price of a complete copy today is estimated at $25−35 million.

A two-volume paper edition of the Gutenberg Bible was stolen from Moscow State University in 2009 and subsequently recovered in an FSB sting operation in 2013.

Possession of a Gutenberg Bible by a library has been equated to keeping a "trophy book".

== See also ==
- Books in Germany
- Canons of page construction
- Incunable
- Jikji
- List of most expensive books and manuscripts

== General bibliography ==
- Niels Henry Sonne. America's Oldest Episcopal Seminary Library and the Needs It Serves. New York: The Library of The General Theological Seminary, 1953. OCLC 10978996.
- St. Mark's Library (General Theological Seminary). The Gutenberg Bible of the General Theological Seminary. New York: St. Mark's Library, the General Theological Seminary, 1963.
- The Gutenberg Bible of 1454 (in Latin), Göttingen Library, Facsimile Edition, 2 vols + booklet, ed. Stephan Füssel, 1400 pp. Taschen: Cologne.
