= Johannes Gutenberg =

German inventor and craftsman (c. 1393–1406 – 1468)

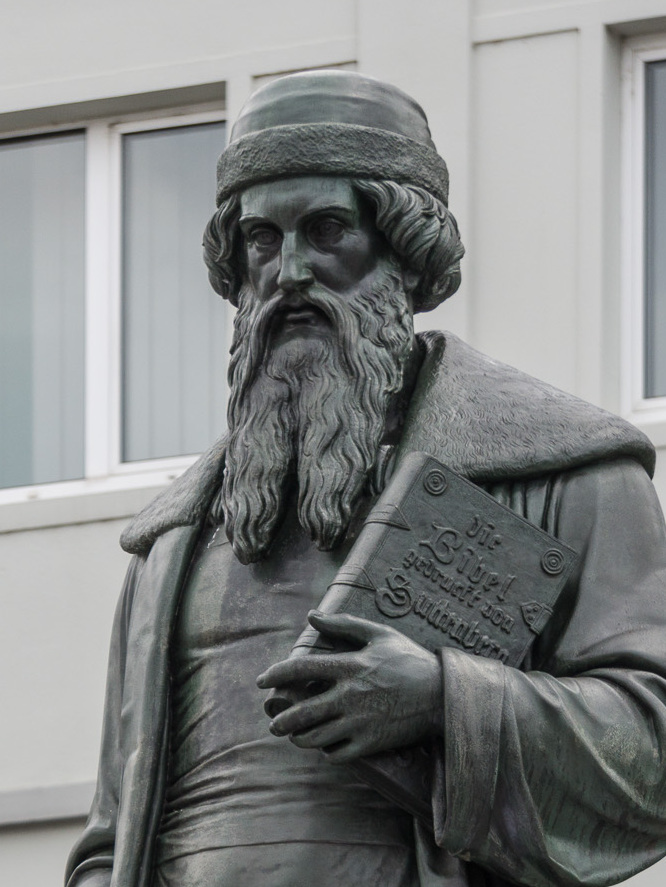
- Gutenberg Monument by Bertel Thorvaldsen, erected 1837 (Note: No contemporary depictions survive.)
- Born: Johannes Gensfleisch zur Laden zum Gutenberg c. 1393–1406; Free City of Mainz, Holy Roman Empire
- Died: 1468 (aged 61–75); Mainz, Electorate of Mainz, Holy Roman Empire
- Occupations: Inventor; craftsman
- Known for: Inventing the printing press Introducing movable type to Europe

Johannes Gensfleisch zur Laden zum Gutenberg (Note: English: /ˈɡuː.tən.bɜːrɡ/ GOO-tən-burg, German: [joˈhanəs ˈɡɛnsflaɪʃ tsuːɐ̯ ˈlaːdn̩ tsʊm ˈɡuːtn̩bɛʁk].) (c. 1393–1406 – 1468) was a German inventor and craftsman who invented the movable-type printing press. Though movable type was already in use in East Asia, Gutenberg's invention of the printing press enabled a much faster rate of printing. The printing press later spread across the world, and led to an information revolution and the unprecedented mass-spread of literature throughout Europe. It had a profound impact on the development of the Renaissance, Reformation, and humanist movements.

Gutenberg's many contributions to printing include the invention of a process for mass-producing movable type; the use of oil-based ink for printing books; adjustable molds; mechanical movable type; and the invention of a wooden printing press similar to the agricultural screw presses of the period. Gutenberg's method for making type is traditionally considered to have included a type metal alloy and a hand mould for casting type. The alloy was a mixture of lead, tin, and antimony that melted at a relatively low temperature for faster and more economical casting, cast well, and created a durable type. His major work, the Gutenberg Bible, was the first printed version of the Bible and has been acclaimed for its high aesthetic and technical quality.

Gutenberg is often cited as among the most influential figures in human history and has been commemorated around the world. To celebrate the 500th anniversary of his birth, the Gutenberg Museum was founded in his hometown of Mainz in 1900. In 1997, Time Life picked Gutenberg's invention as the most important of the second millennium.

== Life and career ==
=== Early life ===
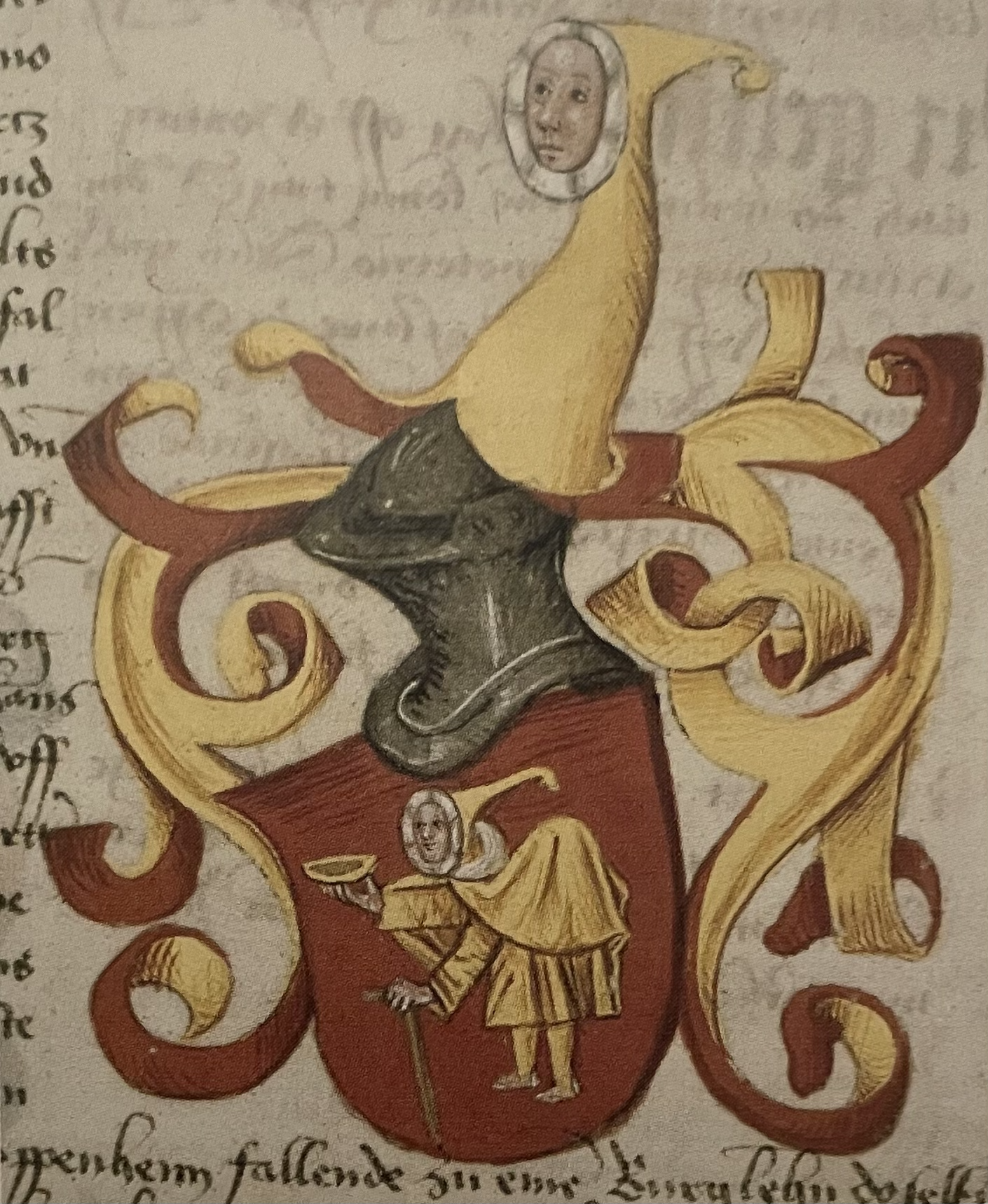
Coat of arms of the Gensfleisch family, from the Register of Fiefs of Frederick I (1461)

Johannes Gutenberg was born in Mainz (in modern-day Germany), a wealthy city along the Rhine, between the 14th and 15th centuries. His exact year of birth is unknown; on the basis of a later document indicating that he came of age by 1420, scholarly estimates have ranged from 1393 to 1406. (Note: Due to minimal extant documentation, identifying Gutenberg's exact year of birth is impossible. Most modern scholars give a range of slightly differing dates for Gutenberg's birth year, including 1394–1406, 1394–1404, 1394–1406, and 1393–1403.) The year 1400 is commonly assigned to Gutenberg, "for the sake of convenience". Tradition also holds his birthdate to be on the feast day of Saint John the Baptist, 24 June, since children of the time were often named after their birthday's patron saint. There is no verification for this assumption, since the name "Johannes"—and variants such as "Johann", "Henne", "Hengin" and "Henchen"—was widely popular at the time. In full, Gutenberg's name was "Johannes Gensfleisch zur Laden zum Gutenberg", with "Laden" and "Gutenberg" being adopted from the family's residences in Mainz. The latter refers to the Hof zum Gutenberg, a large and now destroyed Gothic-style residence inherited by Gutenberg's father. Gutenberg probably spent his earliest years at the manor, which existed beside St. Christoph's. (Note: Local tradition holds that Gutenberg's baptism took place at St. Christoph's, albeit without documentary evidence.)

His father Friele Gensfleisch zur Laden was a patrician and merchant, likely in the cloth trade. Friele later served among the "master of the accounts" for the city and was a Münzerhausgenossenschaft (lit. 'minting house cooperative'), a part of the mint's companionship. (Note: The extent of Friele's actual involvement in the city's finances and trade of precious metal is unknown; the roles may have been largely ceremonial.) In 1386, Friele married his second wife, Else Wyrich, the daughter of a shopkeeper; Johannes was probably the youngest of the couple's three children, after his brother Friele (b. c. 1387) and sister Else (b. c. 1390–1397). (Note: Gutenberg had a half sister, Patze, from his father's earlier marriage to an otherwise unknown woman.) Scholars commonly assume that the marriage of Friele to Else, who was not of patrician lineage, complicated Gutenberg's future. Because of his mother's commoner status, Gutenberg would never be able to succeed his father at the mint; according to the historian Ferdinand Geldner this disconnect may have disillusioned him from high society and encouraged his unusual career as an inventor. (Note: The historian Sabina Wagner notes that Geldner's theory is "the opinion of many Gutenberg biographers", though not all. The biographer Andreas Venzke has instead suggested that the disconnect inaugurated a life-long sense of determination. Wagner herself consider's the fact that Gutenberg was the youngest son as more impactful than his social standing.)

The patrician (Patrizier) class of Mainz—the Gutenbergs included—held a privileged socioeconomic status, and their efforts to preserve this put them into frequent conflict with the younger generations of guild (Zünfte) craftsmen. A particularly violent conflict arose in February 1411 amid an election dispute, and at least 117 patricians fled the conflict in August. Friele left, presumably with the Gutenberg family, and probably stayed in the nearby Eltville since Else had inherited a house on the town walls there. The archbishop mediated a peace between the rival parties, allowing the family to return to Mainz later that Autumn. The situation remained unstable and the rise of hunger riots forced the Gutenberg family to leave in January 1413 for Eltville.

=== Education ===
No documents survive concerning Gutenberg's childhood or youth. The biographer Albert Kapr remarked that "most books on Gutenberg pass over this period with the remark that not a single fact is known". As the son of a patrician, education in reading and arithmetic would have been expected. A knowledge of Latin—a prerequisite for universities—is also probable, though it is unknown whether he attended a Mainz parish school, was educated in Eltville or had a private tutor. Gutenberg may have initially pursued a religious career, as was common with the youngest sons of patricians, since the proximity of many churches and monasteries made it a safe prospect. It has been speculated that he attended the St. Victor's south of Mainz (near Weisenau), as he would later join their brotherhood. It was the site of a well-regarded school and his family had connections there, though his actual attendance remains speculative.

Gutenberg is assumed to have studied at the University of Erfurt, where there is a record of the enrollment of a student called Johannes de Altavilla in 1418—Altavilla is the Latin form of Eltville am Rhein. Nothing is known of Gutenberg's life for the next fifteen years; however, in March 1434, a letter by him indicates that he was living in Strasbourg, where he had some relatives on his mother's side. He also appears to have been a goldsmith member enrolled in the Strasbourg militia. In 1437, there is evidence that he was instructing a wealthy tradesman on polishing gems, but where he had acquired this knowledge is unknown. In 1436/37, his name also comes up in court in connection with a broken promise of marriage to a woman from Strasbourg, Ennelin. Whether the marriage actually took place is not recorded. Following his father's death in 1419, he is mentioned in the inheritance proceedings.

=== Printing press ===
What was written to me about that marvelous man [Gutenberg] seen at Frankfurt [sic] entirely true. I have not seen complete bibles but only a number of quires of various books [of the Bible]. The script is extremely neat and legible, not at all difficult to follow [You] would be able to read it without effort, and indeed without glasses

— Future pope Pius II in a letter to Cardinal Carvajal, March 1455

Around 1439, Gutenberg was involved in a financial misadventure making polished metal mirrors (which were believed to capture holy light from religious relics) for sale to pilgrims to Aachen: in 1439 the city was planning to exhibit its collection of relics from Emperor Charlemagne but the event was delayed by one year due to a severe flood and the capital already spent could not be repaid.

Until at least 1444 Gutenberg lived in Strasbourg (where a public square is now named for him), most likely in the St. Arbogast parish. It was in Strasbourg in 1440 that he is said to have perfected and unveiled the secret of printing based on his research, mysteriously entitled Aventur und Kunst (enterprise and art). It is not clear what work he was engaged in, or whether some early trials with printing from movable type were conducted there. After this, there is a gap of four years in the record. In 1448, he was back in Mainz, where he took out a loan from his brother-in-law Arnold Gelthus, possibly for a printing press or related paraphernalia. By this date, Gutenberg may have been familiar with intaglio printing; it is claimed that he had worked on copper engravings with an artist known as the Master of Playing Cards.

By 1450, the press was in operation, and a German poem had been printed, possibly the first item to be printed there. Gutenberg was able to convince the wealthy moneylender Johann Fust for a loan of 800 guilders. Peter Schöffer, who became Fust's son-in-law, also joined the enterprise. Schöffer had worked as a scribe in Paris and is believed to have designed some of the first typefaces.

Gutenberg's workshop was set up at Humbrechthof, a property belonging to a distant relative. It is not clear when Gutenberg conceived the Bible project, but for this, he borrowed another 800 guilders from Fust, and work commenced in 1452. At the same time, the press was also printing other, more lucrative texts (possibly Latin grammars). There is also some speculation that there were two presses: one for the pedestrian texts and one for the Bible. One of the profit-making enterprises of the new press was the printing of thousands of indulgences for the church, documented from 1454 to 1455. In 1455, Gutenberg completed his 42-line Bible, known as the Gutenberg Bible. About 180 copies were printed, three quarters on paper, and the rest on vellum.

=== Court case ===
Some time in 1456, there was a dispute between Gutenberg and Fust, in which Fust demanded his money back, and accused Gutenberg of misusing the funds. Gutenberg's two rounds of financing from Fust, totaling 1,600 guilders at 6% interest, now amounted to 2,026 guilders. Fust sued at the archbishop's court. A legal document, from November 1455, records that there was a partnership for a "project of the books," the funds for which Gutenberg had used for other purposes, according to Fust. The court decided in favor of Fust, giving him control over the Bible printing workshop.

Thus, Gutenberg was effectively bankrupt, but it appears he retained, or restarted, a printing shop and participated in the printing of a Bible in the town of Bamberg around 1459, for which he seems at least to have supplied the type. But since his printed books never carry his name or a date, it is difficult to be certain. It is possible the large Catholicon dictionary, printed in Mainz in 1460 or later, was executed in his workshop, but there has been considerable scholarly debate. Meanwhile, the Fust–Schöffer shop was the first in Europe to bring out a book with the printer's name and date, the Mainz Psalter of August 1457, and while proclaiming the mechanical process by which it had been produced, it made no mention of Gutenberg.

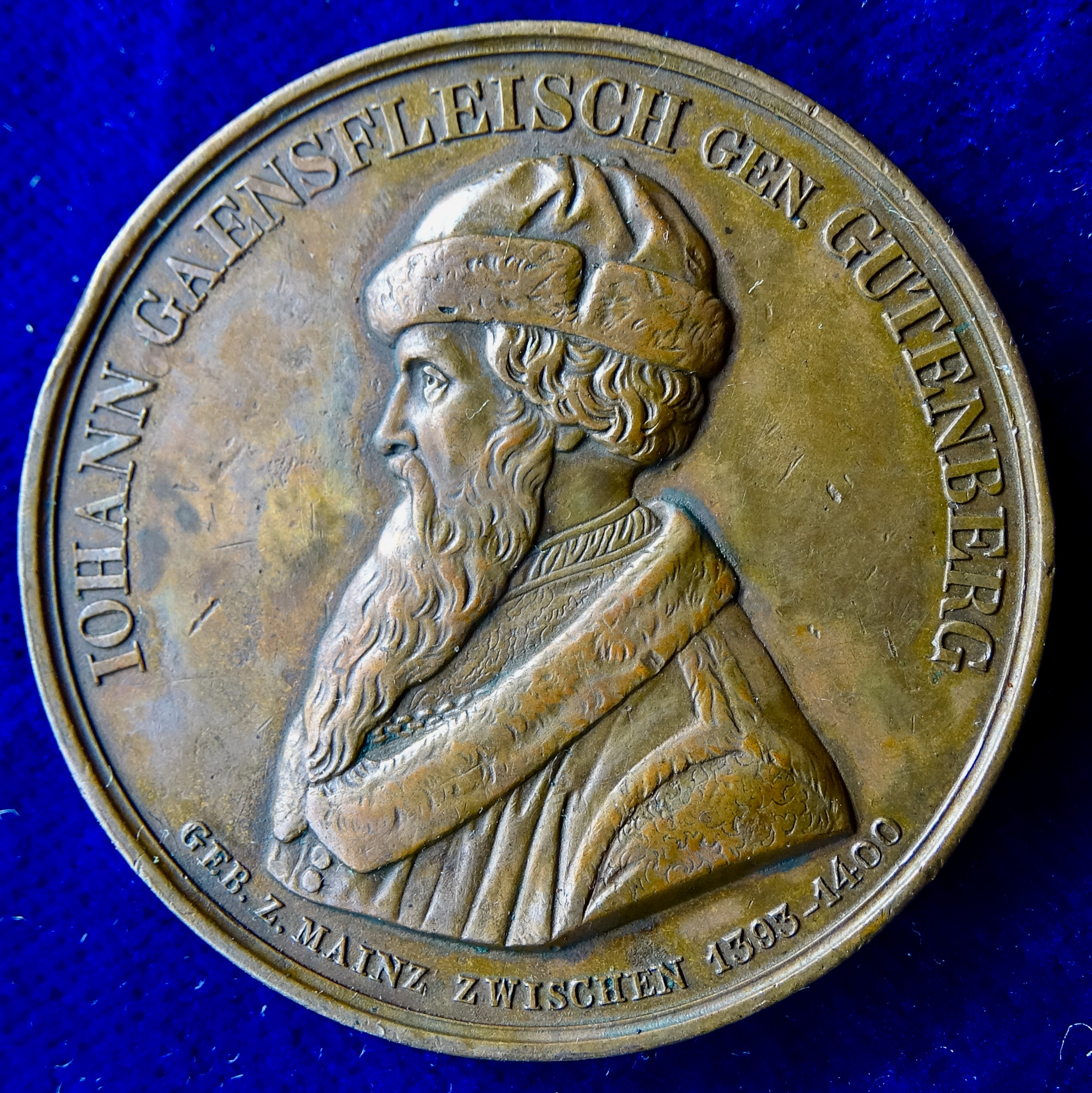
Celebration medal by Friedrich Anton König in 1840, the 400th anniversary of Johannes Gutenberg's printing press invention, obverse

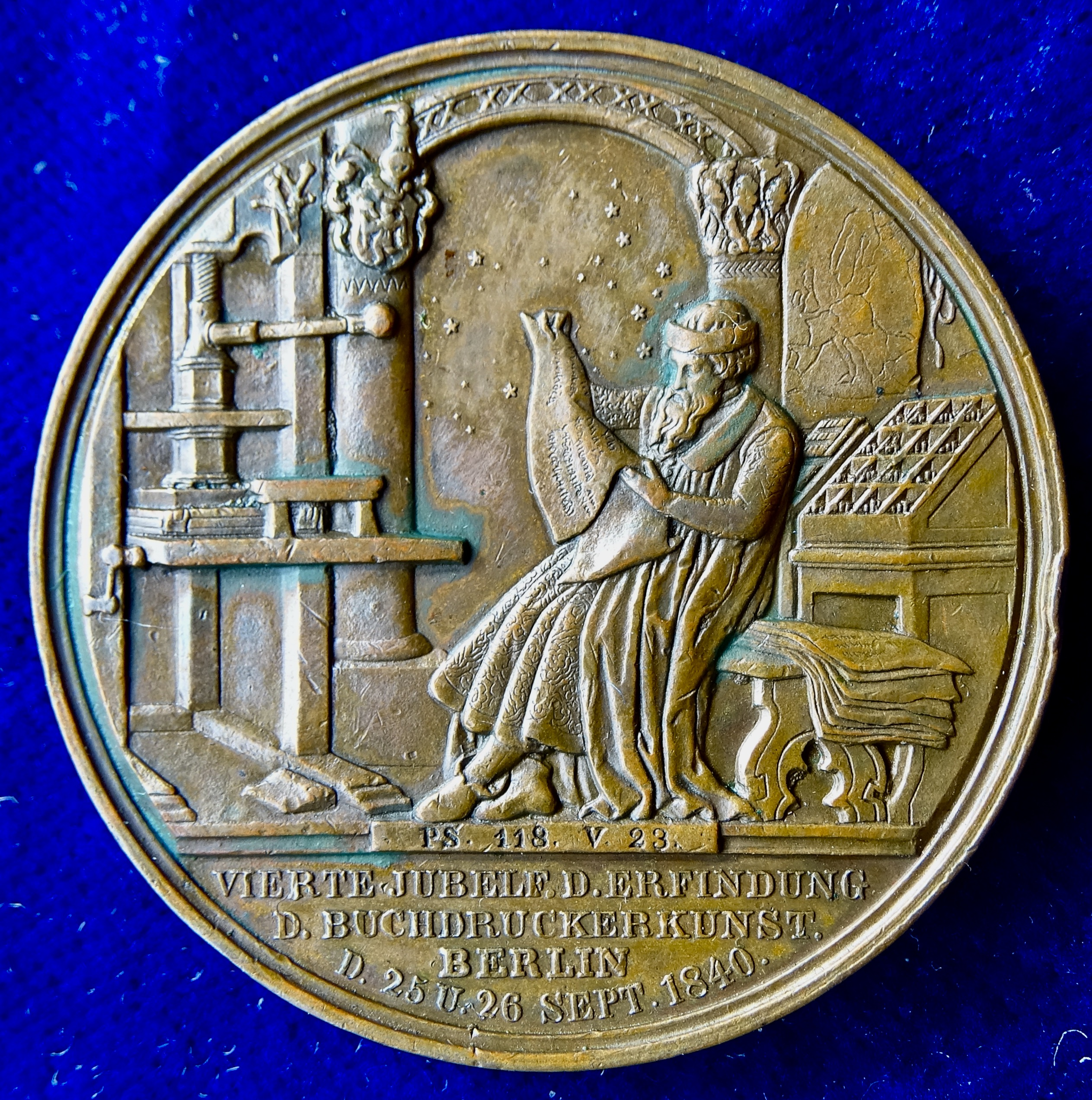
The reverse of the medal: Johannes Gutenberg in his workshop, sitting in front of his printing press

A 17th-century copper engraving depiction of Gutenberg

=== Later life ===
In 1462, during the devastating Mainz Diocesan Feud, Mainz was sacked by Archbishop Adolph von Nassau. On 18 January 1465, Gutenberg's achievements were recognized by Archbishop von Nassau. He was given the title Hofmann (gentleman of the court). This honor included a stipend and an annual court outfit, as well as 2,180 litres of grain and 2,000 litres of wine tax-free. Gutenberg died in 1468 and was buried likely as a tertiary in the Franciscan church at Mainz. This church and the cemetery were later destroyed, and Gutenberg's grave is now lost. In 1504, he was mentioned as the inventor of typography in a book by Professor Ivo Wittig. It was not until 1567 that the first portrait of Gutenberg, almost certainly an imaginary reconstruction, appeared in Heinrich Pantaleon's biography of famous Germans.

== Printing ==
=== Printing method ===
An early wooden printing press, depicted in 1568. Such presses could produce up to 240 impressions per hour.

Gutenberg's early printing process, and what texts he printed with movable type, are not known in great detail. His later Bibles were printed in such a way as to have required large quantities of type, some estimates suggesting as many as 100,000 individual sorts. Setting each page would take, perhaps, half a day, and considering all the work in loading the press, inking the type, pulling the impressions, hanging up the sheets, distributing the type etc., the Gutenberg–Fust shop may have employed many craftsmen.

Gutenberg's technique of making movable type remains unclear. In the following decades, punches and copper matrices became standardized in the rapidly disseminating printing presses across Europe. Whether Gutenberg used this sophisticated technique or a somewhat primitive version has been the subject of considerable debate.

In the standard process of making type, a hard metal punch (made by punchcutting, with the letter carved back to front) is hammered into a softer copper bar, creating a matrix. This is then placed into a hand-held mould and a piece of type, or "sort", is cast by filling the mould with molten type-metal; this cools almost at once, and the resulting piece of type can be removed from the mould. The matrix can be reused to create hundreds, or thousands, of identical sorts so that the same character appearing anywhere within the book will appear very uniform, giving rise, over time, to the development of distinct styles of typefaces or fonts. After casting, the sorts are arranged into type cases, and used to make up pages which are inked and printed, a procedure which can be repeated hundreds, or thousands, of times. The sorts can be reused in any combination, earning the process the name of "movable type".

The invention of the making of types with punch, matrix and mold has been widely attributed to Gutenberg; however, 2000s evidence suggests that Gutenberg's process was somewhat different. If he used the punch and matrix approach, all his letters should have been nearly identical, with some variation due to miscasting and inking. The type used in Gutenberg's earliest work shows other variations.

European output of books printed with movable types from Gutenberg to 1800

In 2001, the physicist Blaise Agüera y Arcas and Princeton librarian Paul Needham, used digital scans of a Papal bull in the Scheide Library, Princeton, to carefully compare the same letters (types) appearing in different parts of the printed text. Gutenberg's type had irregularities, particularly in simple characters like the hyphen. These variations could not have been caused by ink smears or wear on the metal pieces. Detailed image analysis suggests the variations could not have come from the same matrix. Examination of transmitted light pictures of the page revealed substructures, in the type, that could not have been made using traditional punchcutting techniques.

Based on these observations, researchers hypothesized that Gutenberg's method involved impressing simple shapes in a "cuneiform" style onto a matrix made of a soft material, such as sand. Casting the type would then destroy the mold, necessitating the recreation of the matrix for each additional sort. This hypothesis could potentially explain both the variations in the type and the substructures observed in the printed images. Thus, they speculated that "the decisive factor for the birth of typography", the use of reusable moulds for casting type, was a more progressive process than was previously thought. They suggested that the additional step of using the punch to create a mould that could be reused many times was not taken until twenty years later, in the 1470s. Others have not accepted some or all of their suggestions, and have interpreted the evidence in other ways, and the truth of the matter remains uncertain.

A 1568 book Batavia by Hadrianus Junius from Holland claims the idea of the movable type came to Gutenberg from Laurens Janszoon Coster via Fust, who was apprenticed to Coster in the 1430s and may have brought some of his equipment from Haarlem to Mainz. While Coster appears to have experimented with moulds and castable metal type, there is no evidence that he had actually printed anything with this technology. He was an inventor and a goldsmith. However, there is one indirect supporter of the claim that Coster might be the inventor. The author of the Cologne Chronicle of 1499 quotes Ulrich Zell, the first printer of Cologne, that printing was performed in Mainz in 1450, but that some type of printing of lower quality had previously occurred in the Netherlands; however, the chronicle does not mention the name of Coster, while it actually credits Gutenberg as the "first inventor of printing" in the very same passage (fol. 312). The first securely dated book by Dutch printers is from 1471, and the Coster connection is today regarded as a mere legend. The 19th-century printer and typefounder Fournier Le Jeune suggested that Gutenberg was not using type cast with a reusable matrix, but wooden types that were carved individually. A similar suggestion was made by Nash in 2004.

=== Printed books ===
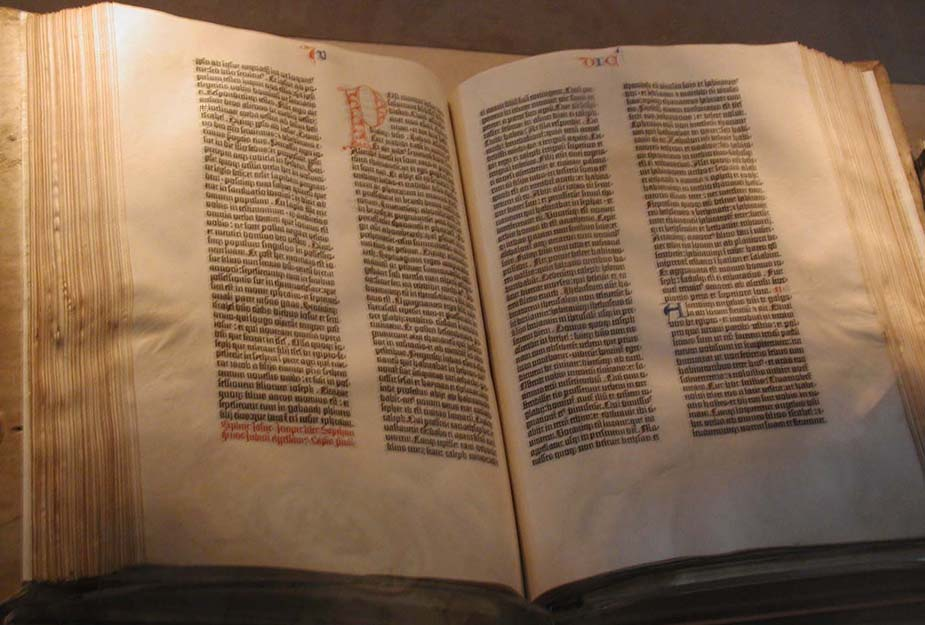
The Gutenberg Bible, now housed at the Library of Congress in Washington, D.C.

Between 1450 and 1455, Gutenberg printed several texts, some of which remain unidentified; his texts did not bear the printer's name or date, so attribution is possible only from typographical evidence and external references. Certainly church documents including a papal letter and two indulgences were printed, one of which was issued in Mainz. In view of the value of printing in quantity, seven editions in two styles were ordered, resulting in several thousand copies being printed. Some printed editions of Ars Minor, a schoolbook on Latin grammar by Aelius Donatus, may have been printed by Gutenberg; these have been dated either 1451–52, or 1455. Every copy of printed books were identical; this was a significant departure from handwritten manuscripts, which left room for possible human error.

In 1455, Gutenberg completed copies of a well-executed folio Bible (Biblia Sacra), with 42 lines on each page. Copies sold for 30 florins each, roughly three years' wages for a clerk. Nonetheless, it was much cheaper than a manuscript Bible that could take a single scribe over a year to prepare. After printing, some copies were rubricated or hand-illuminated in the same elegant way as manuscript Bibles from the same period. 48 substantially complete copies are known to survive, including two at the British Library that can be viewed and compared online. The text lacks modern features such as page numbers, indentations, and paragraph breaks. An undated 36-line edition of the Bible was printed, probably in Bamberg in 1458–60, possibly by Gutenberg. A large part of it was shown to have been set from a copy of Gutenberg's Bible, thus disproving earlier speculation that it was the earlier of the two.

== Legacy ==
=== Influence ===
What the world is today, good and bad, it owes to Gutenberg. Everything can be traced to this source, but we are bound to bring him homage, … for the bad that his colossal invention has brought about is overshadowed a thousand times by the good with which mankind has been favored.

— American writer Mark Twain (1835–1910)

Gutenberg's invention had an enormous impact on subsequent human history, both on cultural and social matters. His design directly impacted the mass spread of books across Europe, causing an information revolution. As a result, Venzke describes the inauguration of the Renaissance, Reformation and humanist movement as "unthinkable" without Gutenberg's influence. Described as "one of the most recognized names in the world", a team of US journalists voted Gutenberg as the "man of the millennium" in 1999. Similarly, in 1999 the A&E Network ranked Gutenberg the No. 1 most influential person of the second millennium on their "Biographies of the Millennium" countdown, while Time–Life magazine picked Gutenberg's invention as the most important of the second millennium in 1997. The scholar of paper history, Thomas Francis Carter, drew parallels between Cai Lun, the traditional inventor of paper during the Eastern Han dynasty, and Gutenberg, calling them "spiritual father and son" respectively. In his 1978 book, The 100: A Ranking of the Most Influential Persons in History, Michael H. Hart ranked him 8th, below Cai but above figures such as Christopher Columbus, Albert Einstein and Charles Darwin.

The capital of printing in Europe shifted to Venice, where printers like Aldus Manutius ensured widespread availability of the major Greek and Latin texts. The claims of an Italian origin for movable type have focused on this rapid rise of Italy in movable-type printing. This may perhaps be explained by the prior eminence of Italy in the paper and printing trade. Italy's economy was growing rapidly at the time, facilitating the spread of literacy. Christopher Columbus had a geography book printed with movable type, bought by his father; it is now in the Biblioteca Colombina in Seville. Finally, the city of Mainz was sacked in 1462, driving many printers into exile.

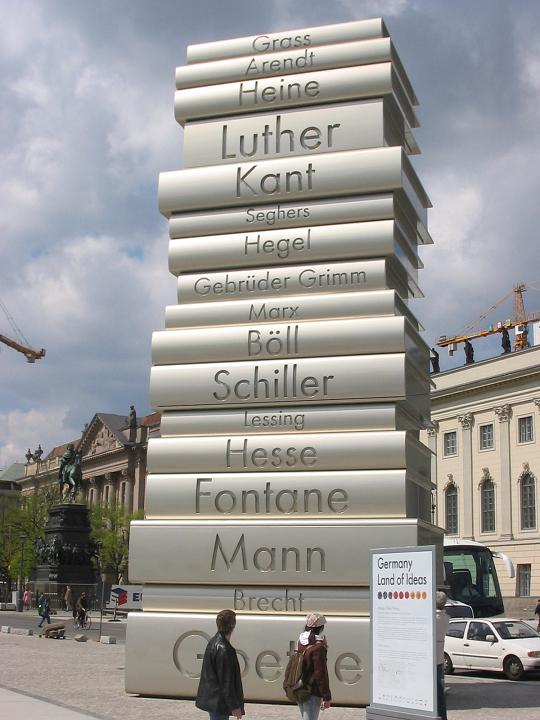
"Modern Book Printing" − a Berlin sculpture commemorating its inventor Gutenberg

Printing was a factor in the Reformation. Martin Luther's Ninety-five Theses were printed and circulated widely; subsequently he issued broadsheets outlining his anti-indulgences position (certificates of indulgences were one of the first items Gutenberg had printed). Due to this, Gutenberg would also be viewed as a proto-Protestant. The broadsheet contributed to the development of the newspaper.

=== Memorials and monuments ===
There are many statues of Gutenberg in Germany, including one by Bertel Thorvaldsen (1837) at Gutenbergplatz in Mainz, home to the eponymous Johannes Gutenberg University of Mainz and Gutenberg Museum on the history of early printing. The latter publishes the Gutenberg-Jahrbuch, the leading periodical in the history of printing, and the book. In 1952, the United States Postal Service issued a five hundredth anniversary stamp commemorating Johannes Gutenberg invention of the movable-type printing press. In space, he is commemorated in the name of the asteroid 777 Gutemberga. Two operas based on Gutenberg are G, Being the Confession and Last Testament of Johannes Gensfleisch, also known as Gutenberg, Master Printer, formerly of Strasbourg and Mainz, from 2001, with music by Gavin Bryars; and La Nuit de Gutenberg, with music by Philippe Manoury, premiered in 2011 in Strasbourg. Project Gutenberg, the oldest digital library, commemorates Gutenberg's name. The Mainz Johannisnacht (St. John's Night), has commemorated Gutenberg in his native city since 1968.
