= Red letter day =

Any day of special significance or opportunity

A red letter day (sometimes hyphenated as red-letter day) is any day of special significance or opportunity. Its roots are in classical antiquity; for instance, important days are indicated in red in a calendar dating from the Roman Republic (509–27 BC).

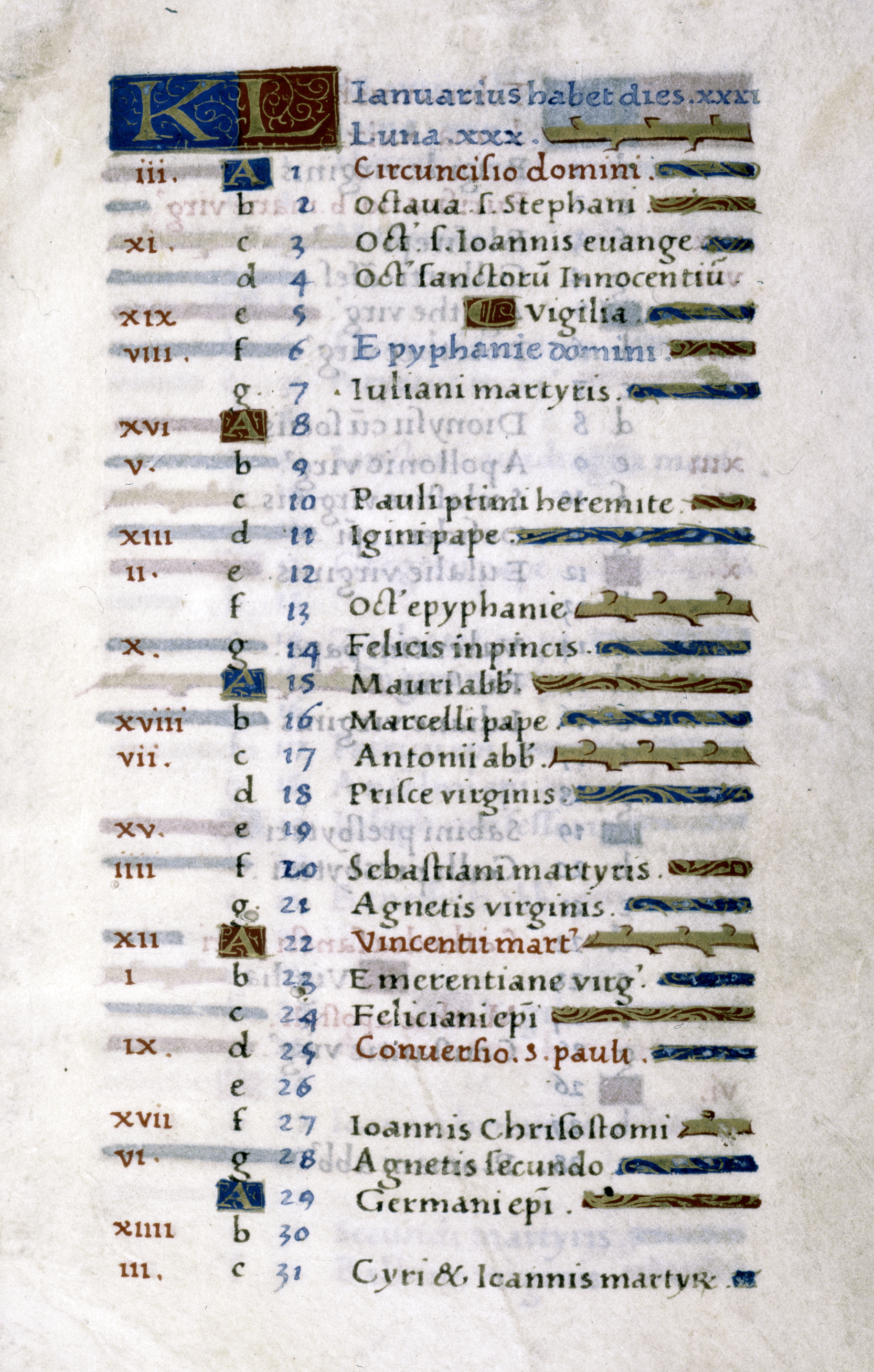
16th century calendar for the month of January, with some entries emphasised in red text

In medieval manuscripts, initial capitals and highlighted words (known as rubrics) were written in red ink. The practice was continued after the invention of the printing press, including in Catholic liturgical books. Many calendars still indicate special dates, festivals and holidays in red instead of black.

In the universities of the UK, scarlet days are when doctors may wear their scarlet 'festal' or full dress gowns instead of their undress ('black') gown.

In Norway, Sweden, Hong Kong, South Korea, Indonesia and some Latin American countries, a public holiday is sometimes referred to as "red day" (rød dag, röd dag, 빨간 날, 紅日, tanggal merah), as it is printed in red in calendars.

== Liturgical and ecclesiastical use ==
The term "red letter day" originates from the medieval practice of marking the festivals of the Christian calendar in red ink in illuminated manuscripts and calendars. These were distinguished from "black letter days," which were ordinary weekdays or the feast days of minor saints. The practice is etymologically related to the word rubric, derived from the Latin rubrica (red ochre), which referred to the instructions for a liturgy written in red ink to distinguish them from the text of the prayers.

=== Anglican tradition ===
In the Church of England and the wider Anglican Communion, red letter days are those major feast days for which a specific Collect, Epistle, and Gospel are provided in the Book of Common Prayer. These days traditionally include:

- All Sundays of the year
- Feasts of Our Lord (e.g., Christmas, Epiphany, Easter, Ascension)
- Feasts of the Apostles and Evangelists
- The Annunciation and the Purification of the Virgin
- All Saints' Day and St Michael and All Angels

Historically, "black letter days" in the Anglican calendar (minor saints and commemorations) did not have special liturgical provisions in the 1662 prayer book, though they were noted for historical and devotional purposes. On red letter days, it was traditionally expected that the Holy Communion would be celebrated, and in many jurisdictions, these were also legal public holidays during which secular work was discouraged.

=== Roman Catholic and other Western usage ===
While the specific phrase "red letter day" is most common in English-speaking countries with an Anglican heritage, the practice of highlighting significant feasts in red is universal across Western Christian liturgy. In the General Roman Calendar, the highest-ranking feasts—solemnities and feast days—correspond to the concept of red letter days.

In medieval Europe, these were "days of obligation" (festum fori), where the faithful were required to attend Mass and abstain from servile work. Although modern liturgical printing often uses various colors or bold fonts, the historical distinction remains a foundational element of hagiography and the organisation of the liturgical year.

== Legal ==
On red letter days, judges of the High Court of England and Wales (King's Bench Division) wear, at sittings of the Court of Law, their scarlet robes (see court dress). Red letter days for these purposes are a fixed selection of saints' days (sometimes coinciding with the traditional start or end dates of the legal terms during which sittings of the High Court take place) and of national celebrations, mostly associated with senior members of the British royal family (and, therefore, changing from generation to generation).

=== Current red letter days in the United Kingdom ===
The list of red letter days currently observed in the United Kingdom (and on which, if a weekday, judges of the English High Court (King's Bench Division) traditionally wear, at sittings of the Court of Law, their scarlet robes) is as follows:

October

- 18 (St Luke)
- 28 (St Simon and St Jude)

November

- 1 (All Saints)
- 14 (King Charles III born, 1948)
- 2nd Saturday in November (Lord Mayor's Day)
- 30 (St Andrew)

December

- 21 (St Thomas)

January

- 25 (Conversion of St Paul)

February

- 2 (Candlemas)
- Moveable (Ash Wednesday)
- 24 (St Matthias)

March

- 1 (St David)
- 25 (Lady Day)

April

- 25 (St Mark)

May

- 1 (St Philip and St James)
- 6 (Coronation of King Charles III and Queen Camilla, 2023)
- Moveable (Ascension Day)

June

- 2nd Saturday in June (King's Official Birthday)
- 11 (St Barnabas)
- 24 (St John the Baptist)
- 29 (St Peter)

July

- 17 (Queen Camilla born, 1947)
- 25 (St James)

Days that never fall within the legal term are not red letter days (examples being Christmas Day and Easter Day).

=== Former red letter days in the United Kingdom ===
A comparison can be drawn with the Red Letter Days listed 100 years ago in Dress and Insignia Worn at His Majesty's Court (1921), which are on the same principle (a fixed selection of saints' days, plus days honouring senior members of the Royal Family), except that the modern list adds the national saints of Wales and Scotland (St David and St Andrew, not listed in 1921) although not the national saint of England (St George). The paraphrased 1921 listing is:

- 25 January (Conversion of St Paul)
- 2 February (Purification of the Blessed Virgin Mary)
- 24 February (St Matthias)
- Ash Wednesday (movable)
- 25 March (Annunciation of the Blessed Virgin Mary)
- 25 April (St Mark)
- 1 May (St Philip and St James)
- Ascension Day (movable)
- 6 May (King George V's Accession)
- 26 May (Queen Mary's Birthday)
- 3 June (King George V's Birthday)
- 11 June (St Barnabas)
- 22 June (King George V and Queen Mary's Coronation)
- 23 June (Edward, Prince of Wales's Birthday)
- 24 June (St John the Baptist)
- 29 June (St Peter and St Paul)
- Celebration of King George V's Birthday (movable)
- 25 June (St James)
- 18 October (St Luke)
- 28 October (St Simon and St Jude)
- 1 November (All Saints)
- 9 November (Lord Mayor's Day)
- 30 November (St Andrew)
- 1 December (Birthday of Queen Alexandra)
- 21 December (St Thomas)

== See also ==
- Red envelope – giving a gift in a red envelope, associated with certain dates or events in East Asian cultures
