= Ilona Hubay =

Hungarian incunabula specialist

Ilona Hubay (July 1, 1902 – June 20, 1982) was a Hungarian specialist in incunabula (pre-1501 printed books) and other early printed books.

After her secondary studies in Pécs, she studied art history at the University of Budapest, where she received a doctorate in 1938. She worked as a librarian in the National Széchényi Library of Hungary, where she was a curator and cataloguer of the Apponyi collection, becoming a head librarian in 1945. In 1951, she was deported by the Communist authorities to a ranch near Szeged, together with her mother. In 1960, she left Hungary for Germany, where she worked first as a librarian in the provincial Landesbibliothek Coburg, and then from 1962 to 1976 as a cataloguer of incunabula in the Bayerische Staatsbibliothek in Munich.

Most famous is her survey of existing copies of the 42-line Gutenberg Bible, Die bekannten Exemplare der zweiundvierzigzeiligen Bibel und ihre Besitzer (1985). 47 copies, and their owners, were identified. After this publication, two more copies were found in Russia. Later, the overview was extended in the on-line British Library's Incunabula Short Title Catalogue.

== Works ==
- Missalia hungarica. Régi magyar misekönyvek, (Old Hungarian missals). Budapest (1938)
- Magyar és magyar vonatkozású röplapok, újságlapok, röpiratok az OSZK-ban 1480-1718, (A catalogue of flyleaves and journals from and about Hungary in the National Library of Hungary, 1480–1718) Budapest, 1948.
- Incunabula der Universitätsbibliothek Würzburg, Wiesbaden (1966)
- Incunabula Eichstätter Bibliotheken (1968)
- Incunabula aus der Staatlichen Bibliothek Neuburg/Donau [und] in Der Benediktinerabtei Ottobeuren. Ottobeuren (1970)
- Incunabula der Staats- und Stadtbibliothek Augsburg. Wiesbaden (1974)
- Die bekannten Exemplare der zweiundvierzigzeiligen Bibel und ihre Besitzer (1985)
