= 36-line Bible =

Movable type printed edition of the Bible

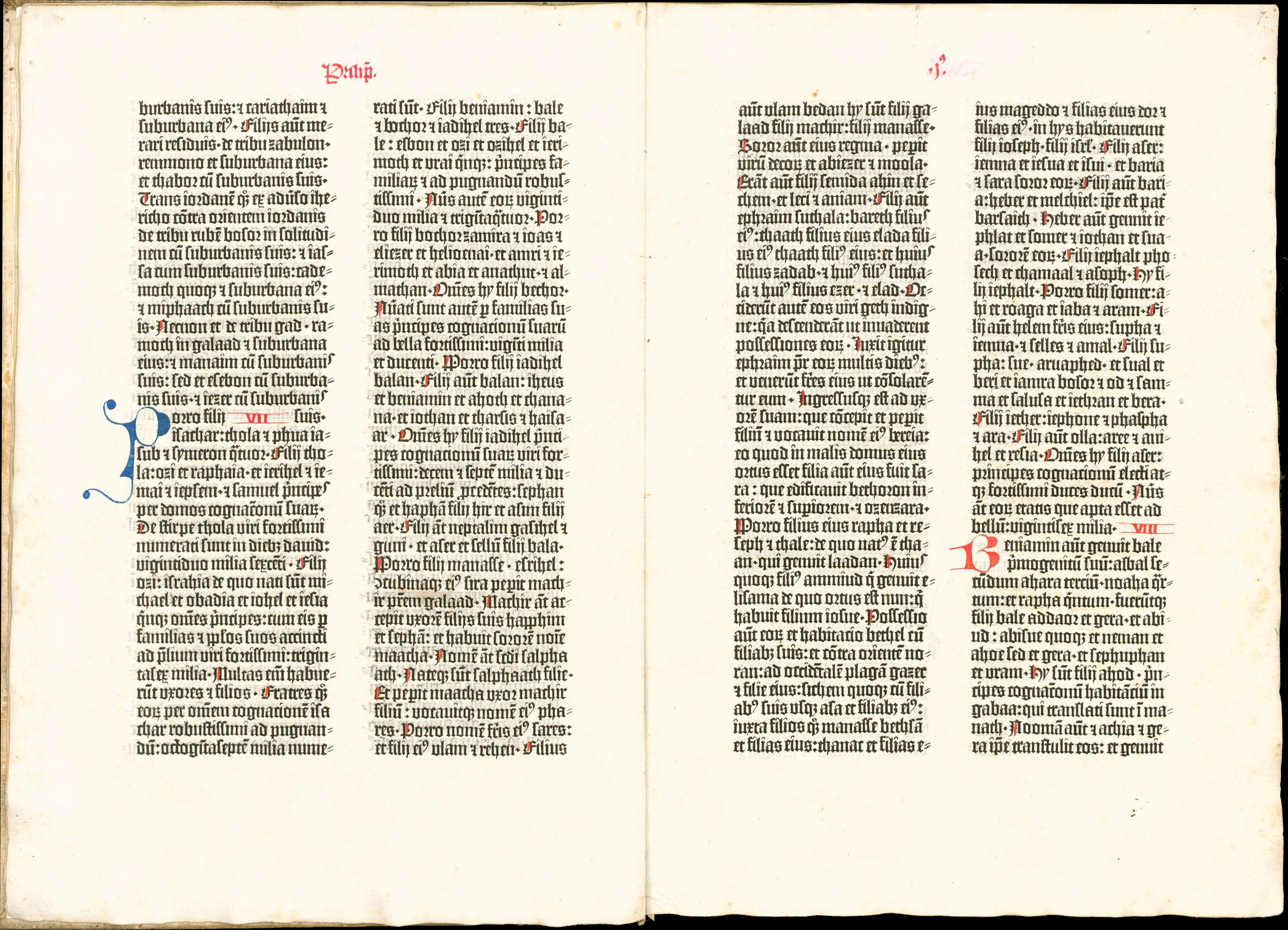
Pages from 36-line Bible at the Bavarian State Library

The 36-line Bible, also known as the "Bamberg Bible", was the second moveable-type-printed edition of the Bible. It is believed to have been printed in Bamberg, Germany, circa 1458–1460. No printer's name appears in the book, but it is possible that Johannes Gutenberg was the printer.

The original Gutenberg Bible is the first moveable-type-printed edition of the Bible, circa 1450–1455, with 42 lines of text on each page in contrast to the Bamberg's 36 lines, and the two Bibles are typically distinguished by this criterion. However, since the 36-line Bible might have been printed by Gutenberg, and was printed at a similar time, it is sometimes loosely referred to as a Gutenberg Bible.

== Date ==
In the past, some scholars have argued that the 36-line Bible was an early, and primitive, version of Gutenberg's 42-line Bible, which would have meant that it was printed prior to 1455. Careful comparisons of the texts, however, have since shown that (with the exception of the first few pages) the 36-line Bible was set from the Gutenberg's 42-line Bible, thus proving the 42-line was the first.

The date "1461" was marked by a rubricator (a scribe who hand-wrote initials and other items in red text, for decoration or emphasis) written in one copy of the 36-line Bible, indicating that it would not have been printed any later than this. Most scholars now agree that the 36-line Bible can be dated to c. 1458–60, making it the second printed edition of the Bible.

An existing fragment of a 40-line Bible was probably printed around 1458 or earlier, and printed with the same type. However it is believed that the fragment is only a trial piece, and that this Bible was never fully printed. It has been suggested that the first few pages of the 36-line Bible (the pages that were not made from Gutenberg's 42-line Bible) were set from the same manuscript used for the 40-line Bible fragment.

== Place of printing ==
Several pieces of evidence suggest that the 36-line Bible was printed in Bamberg, Germany. Firstly, the paper used is from a group of Italian papers known to have been used at Bamberg, and not found in use at Mainz, the location of Gutenberg's press. Second, those copies in early bindings show evidence of having been bound in or near Bamberg. Thirdly, many copies can be shown to have early Bamberg provenances. Furthermore, fragments of the 36-line Bible have been found among the waste-paper used in binding executed at Bamberg or for other books printed there.

== Identity of printer ==
The printer's identity is unknown. It may have been Gutenberg, someone who had worked for him, or someone who had bought type and other equipment from him. Several pieces of evidence show that Gutenberg was linked in some way with the 36-line Bible. In the 1980s cyclotron analysis performed by Richard Schwab and Thomas Cahill established that the ink used was similar to that used for the 42-line Bible.

The type is a version of the so-called D-K type, also known as the 36-line Bible type. This type is crude and older than that used for the 42-line Bible. It had been used for some very early works, probably predating the 42-line Bible and almost certainly printed by Gutenberg, such as an Ars minor by Donatus (various printings c. 1452-53) and several leaves of a pamphlet called the Turkish Calendar for 1455 (likely printed in late 1454), hence the name D-K for "Donatus-Kalendar". Gutenberg lost much of his original equipment to his banker Johann Fust in a lawsuit in 1455, and it is possible this type was the only one left available to him. A number of works seem to have been printed with the D-K type in Mainz between 1455 and 1459, perhaps by Gutenberg.

Albrecht Pfister, who is known to have used the D-K type in Bamberg from at least 1461, has also been suggested as the printer. Many authorities believe that Pfister is unlikely because later works known to be by him have poorer-quality printing.

== Surviving copies ==
Fourteen complete or nearly complete copies are known, all on paper, plus many fragments and single leaves from vellum copies, which have survived because they were used in the bindings of later books. The small number of surviving copies suggests that far fewer were printed than of the 42-line Bible. A higher proportion may have been printed on vellum.

Eight of these copies are in Germany. This Bible has been much less sought after than the 42-line Bible, with a higher proportion remaining in Germany and only one having been acquired by an American library, an incomplete copy at Princeton University Library. A copy is on permanent display in the Sir John Ritblat Gallery in the British Library, and another is contained in the Plantin-Moretus Museum in Antwerp.

== See also ==
- Incunable
