= Disjecta membra =

Phrase

Disjecta membra, also written disiecta membra, is Latin for "scattered fragments" (also scattered limbs, members, or remains) and is used to refer to surviving fragments of ancient poetry, manuscripts, and other literary or cultural objects, including even fragments of ancient pottery. It is derived from disiecti membra poetae, a phrase used by Horace, a Roman poet.

== Ancient and medieval poetry, literature and manuscripts ==
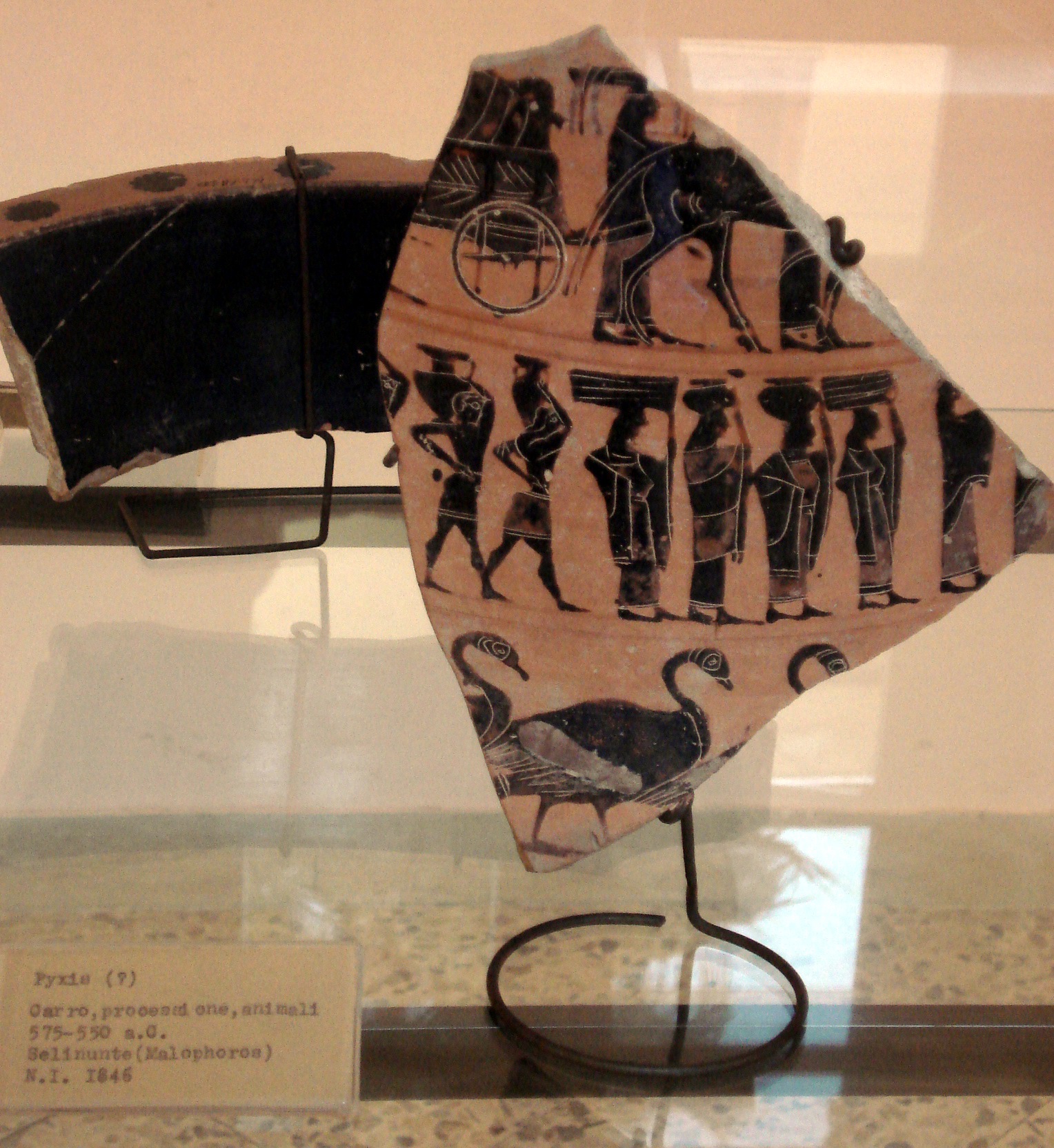
Disjecta membra (a fragment of ancient Greek pottery)

Fragments of ancient writing, especially ancient Latin poetry found in other works, are commonly referred to as disjecta membra. The terms disiecta membra and disjecta membra are paraphrased from the Roman lyric poet Horace (65 BC – 8 BC), who wrote of disiecti membra poetae in his Satires, 1.4.62, referring to the "limbs of a dismembered poet". In full, the term originally appeared as Invenias etiam disiecti membra poetae, in reference to the earlier Roman poet Ennius.

Although Horace's intended meaning remains the subject of speculation and debate, the passage is often taken to imply that if a line from poetry were torn apart and rearranged, the dismembered parts of the poet would still be recognisable. In this sense, in the study of literature, disjecta membra is often used to describe the piecing together of ancient fragments of an identifiable literary source. Similarly, isolated leaves or parts of leaves from ancient or medieval manuscripts may also be termed disjecta membra. Scholars have been able to identify fragments now held in different libraries that originally belonged to the same manuscript.

== Pottery ==
Scholars have long referred to sherds of ancient Greek pottery as disjecta membra. They have studied fragments of ancient Greek pottery in institutional collections, and have attributed many such pieces to the artists who made them. In a number of instances, they have been able to identify fragments now in different collections that belong to the same vase.

== See also ==
- Fragmentology (manuscripts)
