= Red Letter (2025 film) =

Indian suspense thriller film

- Official release poster
- Directed by: Ajit Arora
- Written by: Ajit Arora
- Produced by: Ajit Arora
- Starring: Ajit Arora; Krishma Thakur; Javaid Khan
- Cinematography: Suresh Beesaveni
- Edited by: Dilip Kumar Routray
- Music by: Gulraj Singh
- Production company: Aurora Productions
- Release date: 9 August 2025
- Running time: 37 minutes
- Country: India
- Language: Hindi

Red Letter is a 2025 Indian Hindi-language suspense thriller film. Starring in the film are Ajit Arora, Krishma Thakur, and Javaid Khan in lead roles.

== Production ==
The film was Written, Directed, Produced & Story by Ajit Arora, under the banner of Aurora Productions in association with Zee Music and ShemarooMe OTT. The film was shot at various locations, including Kashmir, and was released on the ShemarooMe App on 9 August 2025.The film received a U/A certification from the Central Board of Film Certification (CBFC).

== Cast ==
- Ajit Arora
- Krishma Thakur
- Javaid Khan
- Affan Shah
- Mohsin Akram
- Nizam Bhat
- Kavita Viirmani
- Munaza as Teacher
- Soliha Bhat
- Mir Khurshid
- Mehreen Iqbal
- Inayat
