= Christian calendar =

List of Christian liturgical calendars, calendars used by predominantly Christian communities or countries, and calendars referred to as the "Christian calendar."

- Gregorian calendar, internationally accepted civil calendar used in Western Christendom
- Armenian calendar, used by Armenian Christians and Churches
- Coptic calendar, Egyptian liturgical calendar (also known as the Alexandrian calendar) used by Coptic Christians and Churches
- Ethiopian calendar, principal calendar used in Ethiopia and Eritrea (also known as the Ge'ez calendar or Eritrean calendar)
- Julian calendar, calendar introduced by Julius Caesar used in most of Eastern Christian churches
  - Revised Julian calendar, calendar used by some Eastern Orthodox churches
- Liturgical year, annually recurring fixed sequence of Christian feast days

== See also ==
- Anno Domini (nostri Jesu Christi), abbreviated AD: "Year of our Lord Jesus Christ"
- List of calendars, listing the calendars of many cultures
