= Scheide Library =

Coordinates: 40.349496°N 74.657367°W

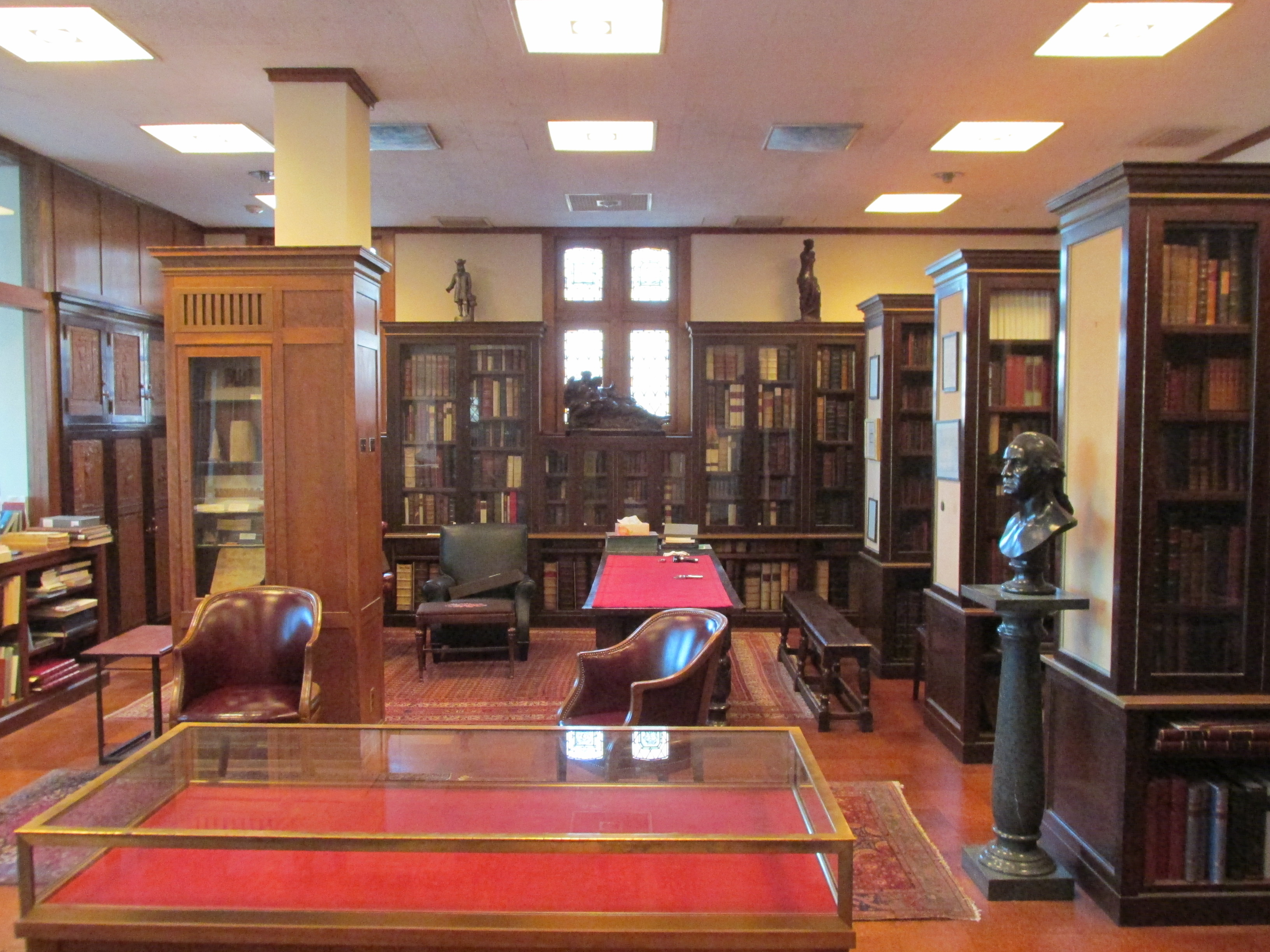
The Scheide Library

The Scheide Library, once a private library, is now a permanent part of the Department of Rare Books and Special Collections at the Princeton University Library. It is housed in the Harvey S. Firestone Memorial Library on the campus of Princeton University.

In 2015, following the death of William Scheide, the library was donated to the University to become part of its permanent collection. It marks the largest donation in the university's history.

The Scheide Library is the only library outside of Europe to possess all four of the first printed bibles: the Gutenberg Bible, the 1460 Bible (or Mentelin Bible), the 36-line Bible, and the 1462 Bible. Other notable holdings include manuscripts by Abraham Lincoln, J.S. Bach, and Ludwig van Beethoven, a copy of the Declaration of Independence, and first editions of works by Shakespeare and Milton. The library also holds significant collections of medieval manuscripts and incunabula, as well as printed books on travel and exploration, and Americana.

The Scheide Library was assembled by three generations of collectors, William T. Scheide, his son, John H. Scheide, and grandson, William H. Scheide. William H. Scheide is also known for founding the Bach Aria Group, which is credited with reviving interest in Bach's cantatas. In 1984, William H. Scheide was honored with the Sir Thomas More Medal for Book Collecting, awarded by the University of San Francisco Gleeson Library and the Gleeson Library Associates, in recognition of his "Private Collecting for the Public Good."
