= Binding waste =

Damaged or extra paper reused in bookbinding

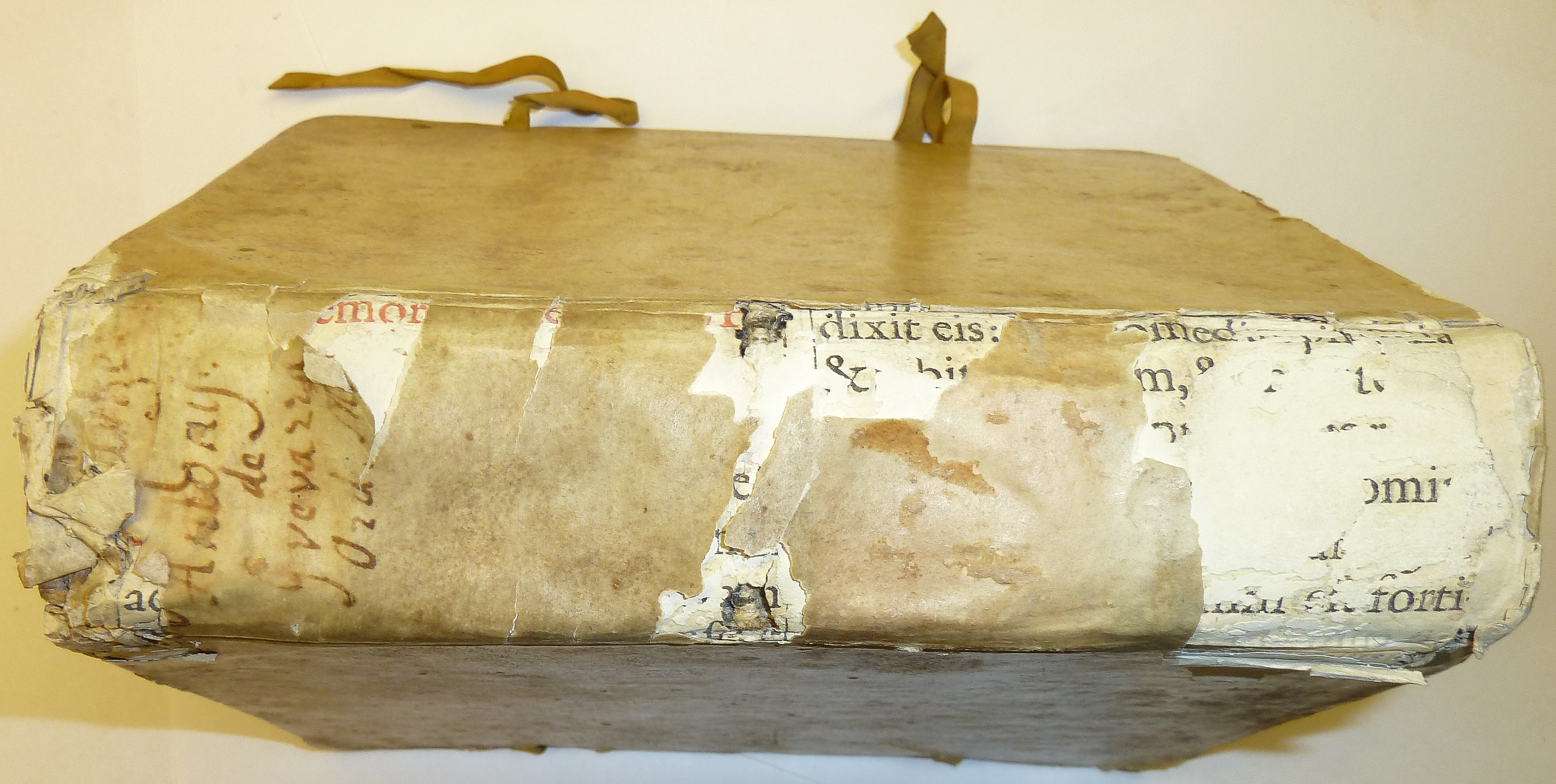
Binder's waste visible beneath the spine of a 17th-century printed book

Binding waste is damaged, misprinted, or surplus paper or parchment reused in bookbinding. Whether as whole sheets or fragments (disjecta membra), these may be used as the exterior binding, as the endpapers, or as a reinforcement beneath the spine.

Especially in medieval and early modern bookbinding, it was common to use discarded or defective sheets to reinforce bindings, even if they had already been used for writing or printing. This practice has led to the survival of texts which may otherwise have been lost. Binding waste can also help to provide a date, and in some cases a location, for the manuscript or printed texts which it accompanies.

For example, a fragment of a handwritten letter to "Mrs Shakspaire" was found in 1978 in Hereford Cathedral Library, bound inside a book printed in 1608 by William Shakespeare's associate Richard Field.

Binder's waste, derived from discarded books, has been distinguished from "printer's waste" (proofs and misprinted sheets) and "bookseller's waste".

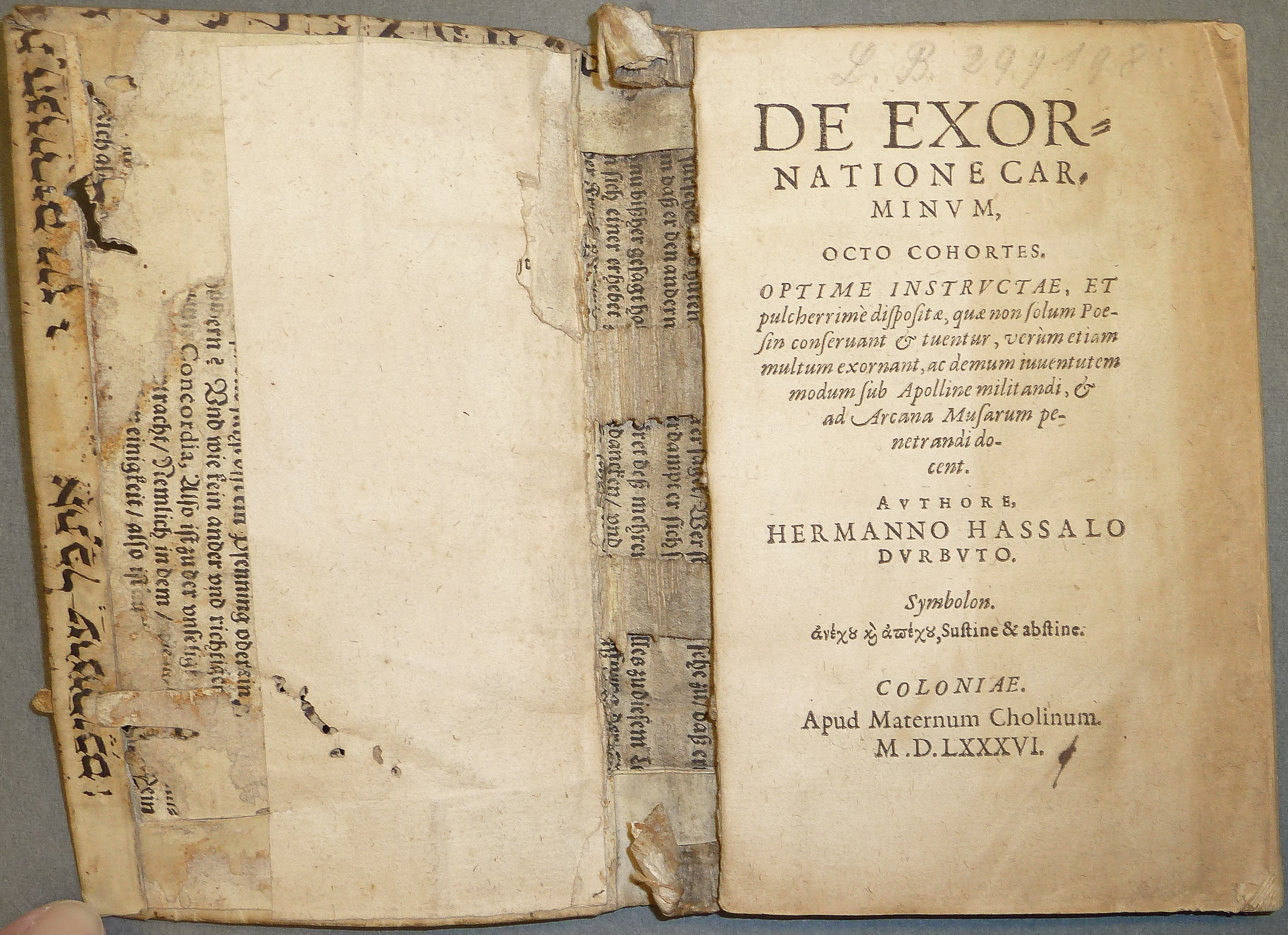
A book in Latin, bound in Hebrew manuscript waste, with German printed waste used to line the spine.

== See also ==
- Fragmentology, the study of manuscript fragments
- Palimpsest, a manuscript page reused to write another document
