= Rubrication =

Red text added for emphasis in a manuscript

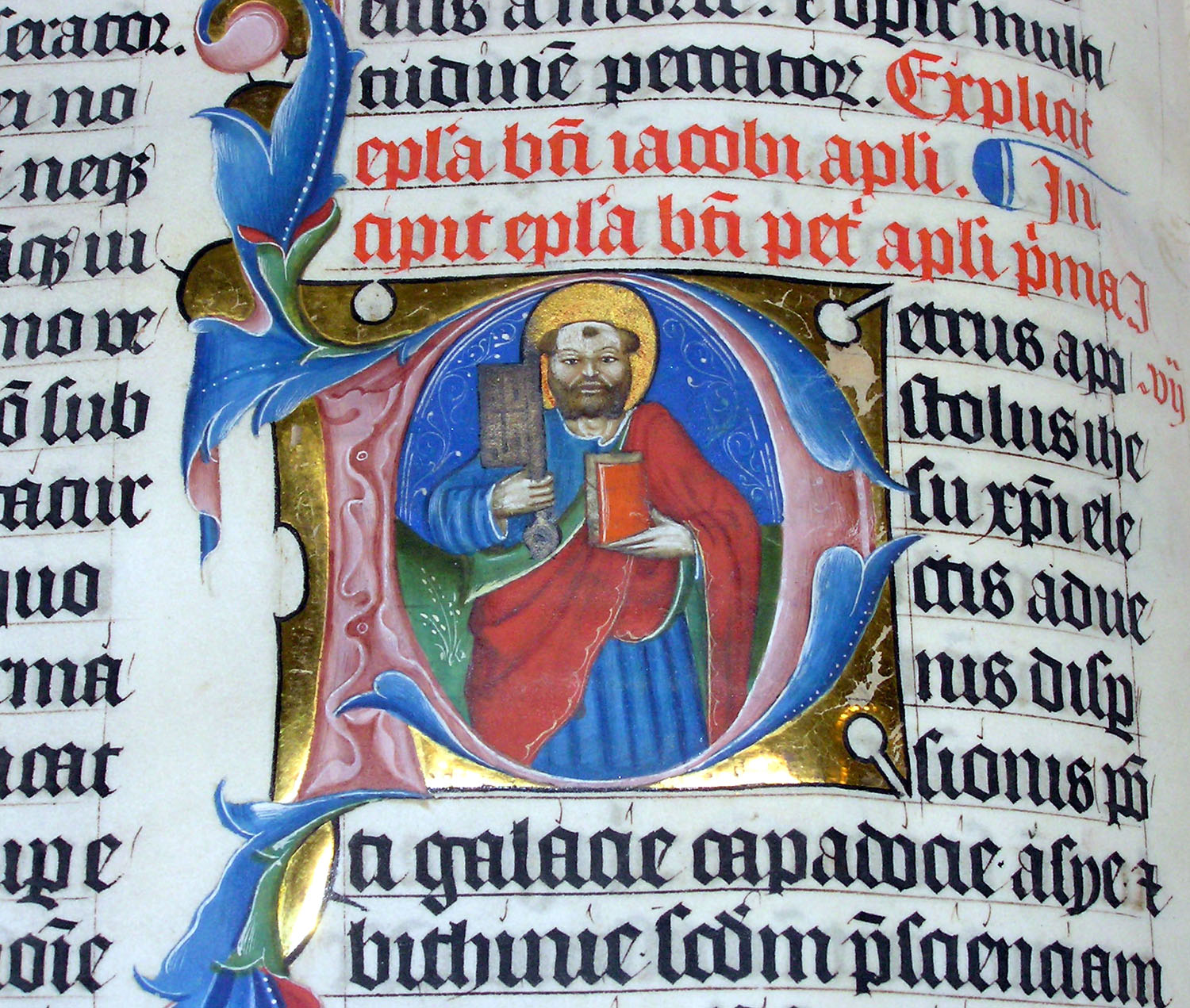
Rubrication and illumination in the Malmesbury Bible from 1407

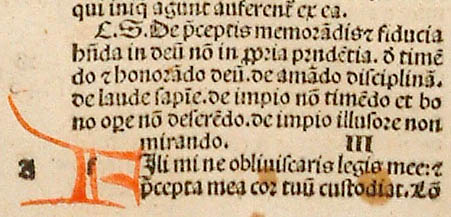
Detail from a rare Blackletter Bible (1497) printed and rubricated in Strasbourg by Johann Grüninger

Rubrication is the addition of text in red ink to a manuscript for emphasis. Practitioners of rubrication, so-called rubricators or rubrishers, were specialized scribes who received text from the original scribe. Rubrication was one of several steps in the medieval process of manuscript making. The term comes from the Latin rubrīcāre, "to color red", the base word being ruber, "red". The practice began in pharaonic Egypt with scribes emphasizing important text, such as headings, new parts of a narrative, etc., on papyri with red ink.

== History ==
The practice of rubrication usually entailed the addition of red headings to mark the end of one section of text and the beginning of another. Such headings were sometimes used to introduce the subject of the following section or to declare its purpose and function. Rubrication was used so often in this regard that the term rubric was commonly used as a generic term for headers of any type or color, though it technically referred only to headers to which red ink had been added. In liturgical books such as missals, red may also be used to give the actions to be performed by the celebrant or others, leaving the texts to be read in black. Important feasts in liturgical calendars were also often rubricated, and rubrication can indicate how scribes viewed the importance of different parts of their text.

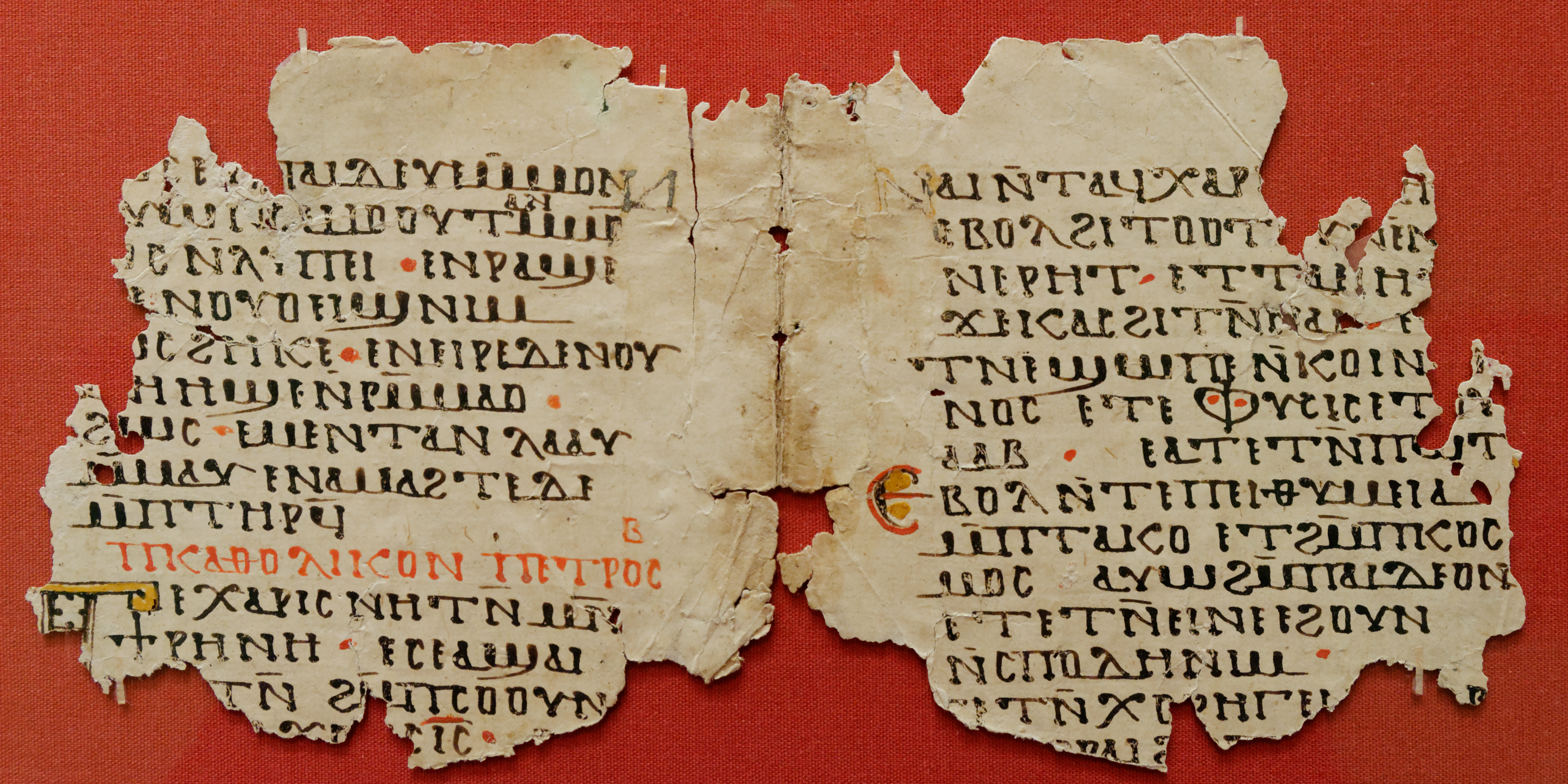
Extract of the second letter of St Paul to the Corinthians (2 Corinthians 6:5–7), and of the second letter of St Peter (2 Peter 2:4–5.7–9), with red ink for certain characters.

Rubrication may also be used to emphasize the starting character of a canto or other division of text; this was often important because manuscripts often consist of multiple works in a single bound volume. This particular type of rubrication is similar to flourishing, wherein red ink is used to style a leading character with artistic loops and swirls. However, this process is far less elaborate than illumination, in which detailed pictures are incorporated into the manuscript often set in thin sheets of gold to give the appearance of light within the text.

Quite commonly the manuscript's initial scribe would provide notes to the rubricator in the form of annotations made in the margins of the text. Such notes were effectively indications to "rubricate here" or "add rubric". In many other cases, the initial scribe also held the position of rubricator, and so he applied rubrication as needed without the use of annotations. This is important, as a scribe's annotations to the rubricator can be used along with codicology to establish a manuscript's history, or provenance.

Later medieval practitioners extended the practice of rubrication to include the use of other colors of ink besides red. Most often, alternative colors included blue and green. After the introduction of movable type printing, readers continued to expect rubrication, which might be done by hand, if there were few rubrics to add, or by a separate print using a red-ink form, later the normal method. The "great majority of incunables did not issue from the press in a finished state... hardly any incunable was considered 'finished' by its printer...", suggesting that hand rubrication provided a sense of legitimacy to the efforts of early printers and their works. This fact, the notion that something about hand written rubrication completes a printed work by attributing to it a sense of legitimacy and finality, is further supported by the fact that red ink "was not merely decorative... red's original function was to articulate the text by indicating such parts as headings that were so essential to the function of manuscripts that the printers had to deal with them in some way".

With the introduction of the printing press from the late medieval period on, space before paragraphs was still left for rubricators to add a pilcrow by hand. However in some circumstances, rubricators could not draw fast enough for publishers' deadlines and books would often be sold with the beginnings of the paragraphs left blank. This is how the practice of indention before paragraphs was created.

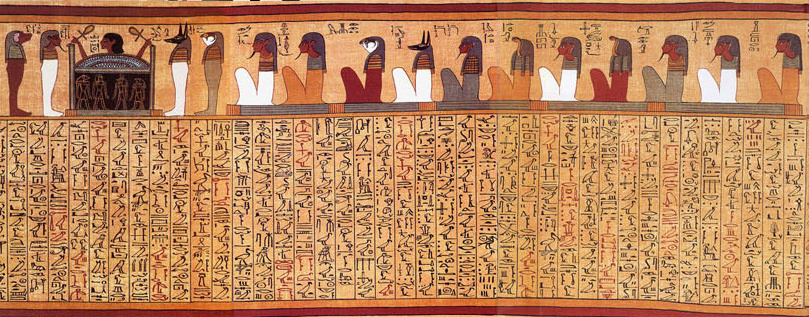
Book of the Dead, showing red ink for some hieroglyphs.

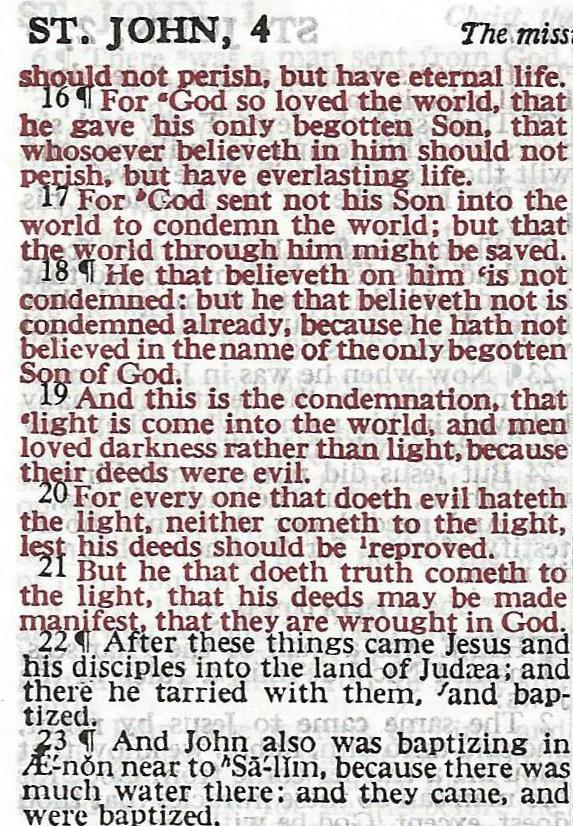
A page from a red-letter edition

The Deir Alla Inscription, the oldest alphabetic West Semitic epigraph, uses red for emphasis. Levine says red was "used in certain parts of the inscriptions for magical effect." It could be an indicator for a different type or source of communication in the writing; authors have various ideas. The same technique was used in the Book of the Dead, the Kuntillet Ajrud inscriptions, and other texts.

== Uses ==
The initial scribe of a text often left notes for the rubricator of where rubrication would be necessary, usually including at least one blank line for the title alone, facts that help modern historians to establish the provenance of the manuscript. Rubrication affected how later generations read and interpreted a text, and this process helped ensure editorial standardization throughout Western Europe.

== Ink ==
The recipe for the red ink is given in Theophilus' De diversis artibus:

To prepare white-flake, get some sheets of lead beaten out thin, place them dry in a hollow piece of wood and pour in some warm vinegar or urine to cover them. Then, after a month, take off the cover and remove whatever white there is, and again replace it as at first. When you have a sufficient amount and you wish to make red lead from it, grind this flake-white on a stone without water, then put it in two or three new pots and place it over a burning fire. You have a slender curved iron rod, fitted at one end in a wooden handle and broad at the top, and with this you can stir and mix this flake-white from time to time. You do this for a long time until the red lead becomes visible.

The process took a long time to complete, but was cheap and used common materials. The white material is lead carbonate and the red material is lead(II,IV) oxide.

== See also ==
- Red letter day
- Red letter edition

== Sources ==
- Clemens, Raymond; Graham, Timothy (December 2007), Introduction to Manuscript Studies, Ithaca, NY: Cornell University Press, ISBN 978-0-80143863-9.
- Smith, Margaret M (1994). "The design relationship between the manuscript and the incunable". In Myers, Robin; Harris, Michael (eds.). A millennium of the book: production, design & illustration in manuscript & print, 900–1900. Winchester, DE: Oak Knoll Press. pp. 23–45.
