= Statue of Johannes Gutenberg =

Statue of Johannes Gutenberg may refer to:

- Gutenberg Monument, Mainz
- Statue of Johannes Gutenberg (Stanford University)
- Statue of Johannes Gutenberg, Strasbourg
