= Gutenbergplatz =

Gutenbergplatz may refer to places named after Johannes Gutenberg:

- Gutenbergplatz (Mainz), a place in Mainz
- Gutenbergplatz (Karlsruhe), a place in Karlsruhe
