= Place Gutenberg =

Public square in Strasbourg, France

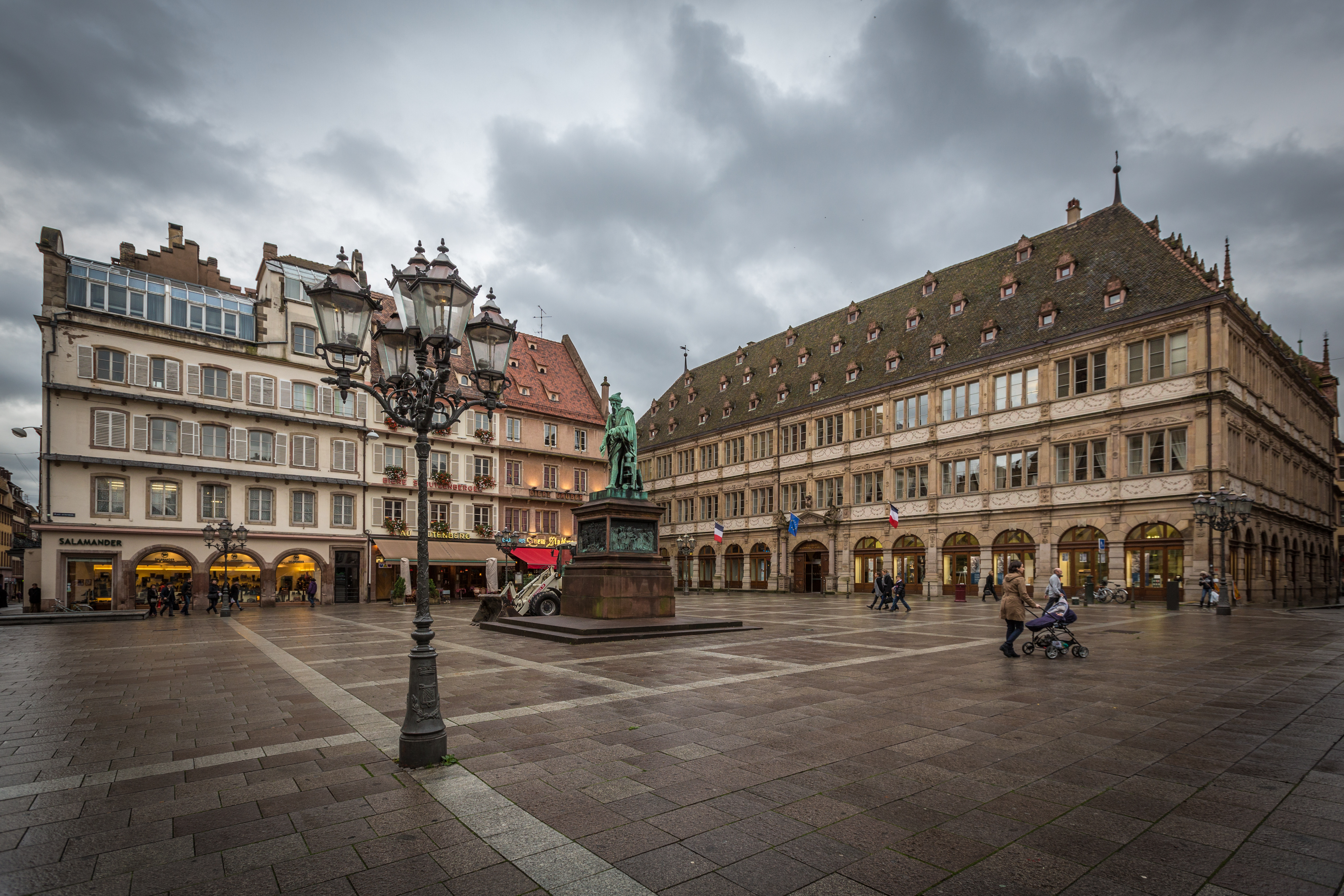
- Pictured in 2013, looking southwest, with the statue of Johannes Gutenberg in the centre
- Interactive map of Place Gutenberg
- Former name: Place Saint-Martin
- Namesake: Johannes Gutenberg
- Location: Strasbourg, Alsace, France
- Coordinates: 48.581333°N 7.748415°E

The Place Gutenberg is a small public square in Strasbourg, France. It is named for German inventor Johannes Gutenberg (c. 1400–1468), who lived in Strasbourg in the 1430s and 1440s. A bronze statue of Gutenberg, the work of sculptor David d'Angers, has stood in the centre of the square since 1840. The square was formerly named the Place Saint-Martin.

The annual Fête des Imprimeurs, which showcases the trades which involve bookmaking, takes places in the square.
