= Statue of Benjamin Franklin (Stanford University) =

Statue in Stanford, California, U.S.

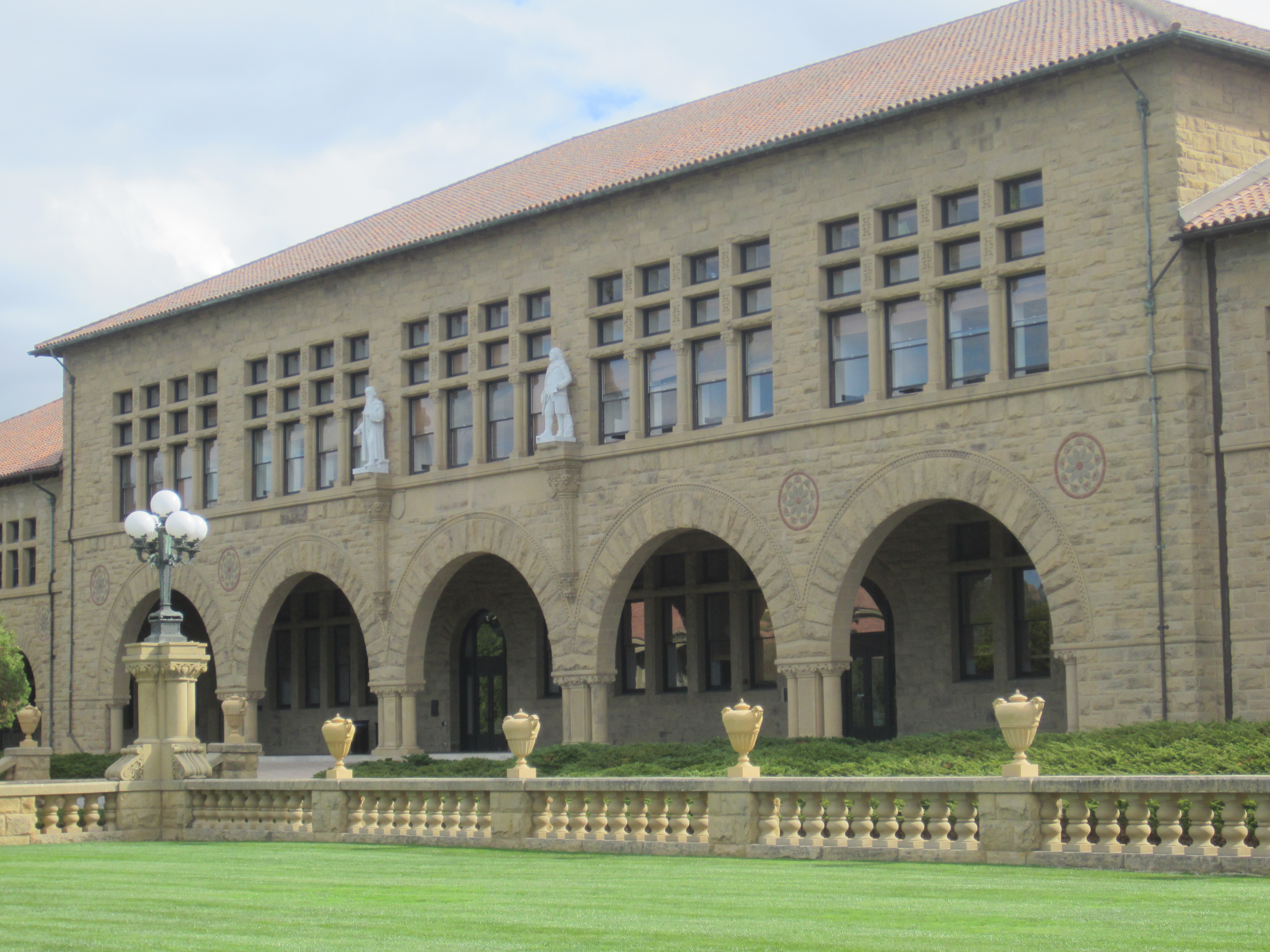
- States of Johannes Gutenberg (left) and Benjamin Franklin (right) on the exterior of Wallenberg Hall, 2018
- Medium: Marble sculpture
- Subject: Benjamin Franklin
- Location: Stanford, California, United States; 37.42841°N 122.16905°W

A statue of Benjamin Franklin is installed on the Stanford University campus in Stanford, California, United States.

== History ==
The original marble by Italian sculptor Antonio Frilli was removed in 1949, along with another by Frilli depicting Johannes Gutenberg. The two statues were replaced by new sculptures by Palo Alto artist Oleg Lobykin in 2013. The statues of Franklin and Gutenberg were installed on perches on the exterior of Wallenberg Hall.

== See also ==
- 2013 in art
- Benjamin Franklin in popular culture
