= Gutenberg Monument =

Monument in Mainz, Germany

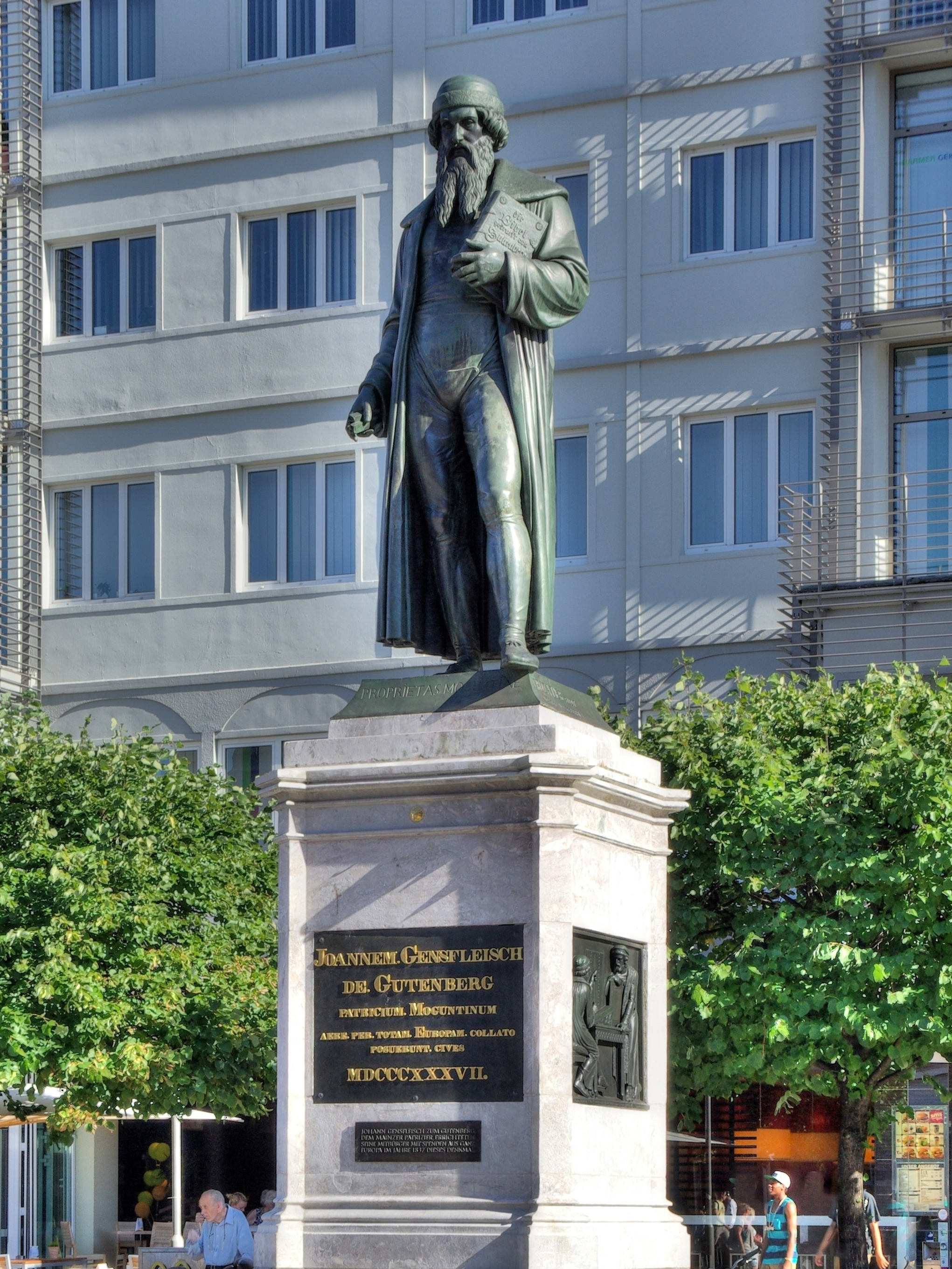
- The monument in 2012
- Artist: Bertel Thorvaldsen
- Completion date: 14 August 1837; 189 years ago
- Subject: Johannes Gutenberg
- Location: Mainz, Germany; 49.9988°N 8.27162°E

The Gutenberg Monument (German: Gutenberg-Denkmal) is a bronze statue monument of Johannes Gutenberg standing atop a plinth with bas-reliefs, designed by Bertel Thorvaldsen, cast in 1836, and erected in Mainz in 1837.

== Description ==
The bronze statue at a height of 11 ft 8.55 in (3.57 m) depicts Johannes Gutenberg standing, and in a medieval costume; he holds in his right hand several movable types, and supported by his left arm the first printed Bible. In one of the bas-reliefs, Gutenberg is seated before a type case and showing the types to his collaborator, Johann Fust; the latter is leaning upon one of the engraved blocks in use before the invention of movable types. The other bas-relief represents Gutenberg examining a printed sheet, taken from the new press, upon which a printer is at work. An inscription upon the face socle reads, in Latin:

Joannem Gensfleisch
de Gutenberg
patricium Moguntinum
aere per totam Europam collato
posuerunt cives
MDCCCXXXVII.
[This statue of] Johannes Gensfleisch
of Gutenberg
patrician of Mainz,
funds having been collected through all of Europe,
was placed by the citizens
[in the year] 1837.

Another inscription at the rear of the socle reads:

Artem quae Graecos latuit latuitque Latinos
Germani sollers extulit ingenium.
Nunc, quidquid veteres sapiunt sapiuntque recentes
non sibi sed populis omnibus sapiunt.
The art which remained unknown to the Greeks and to the Romans
was invented by the keen mind of a German.
Whatever the ancients and the moderns know
they now know not for themselves but for all peoples.

== History ==
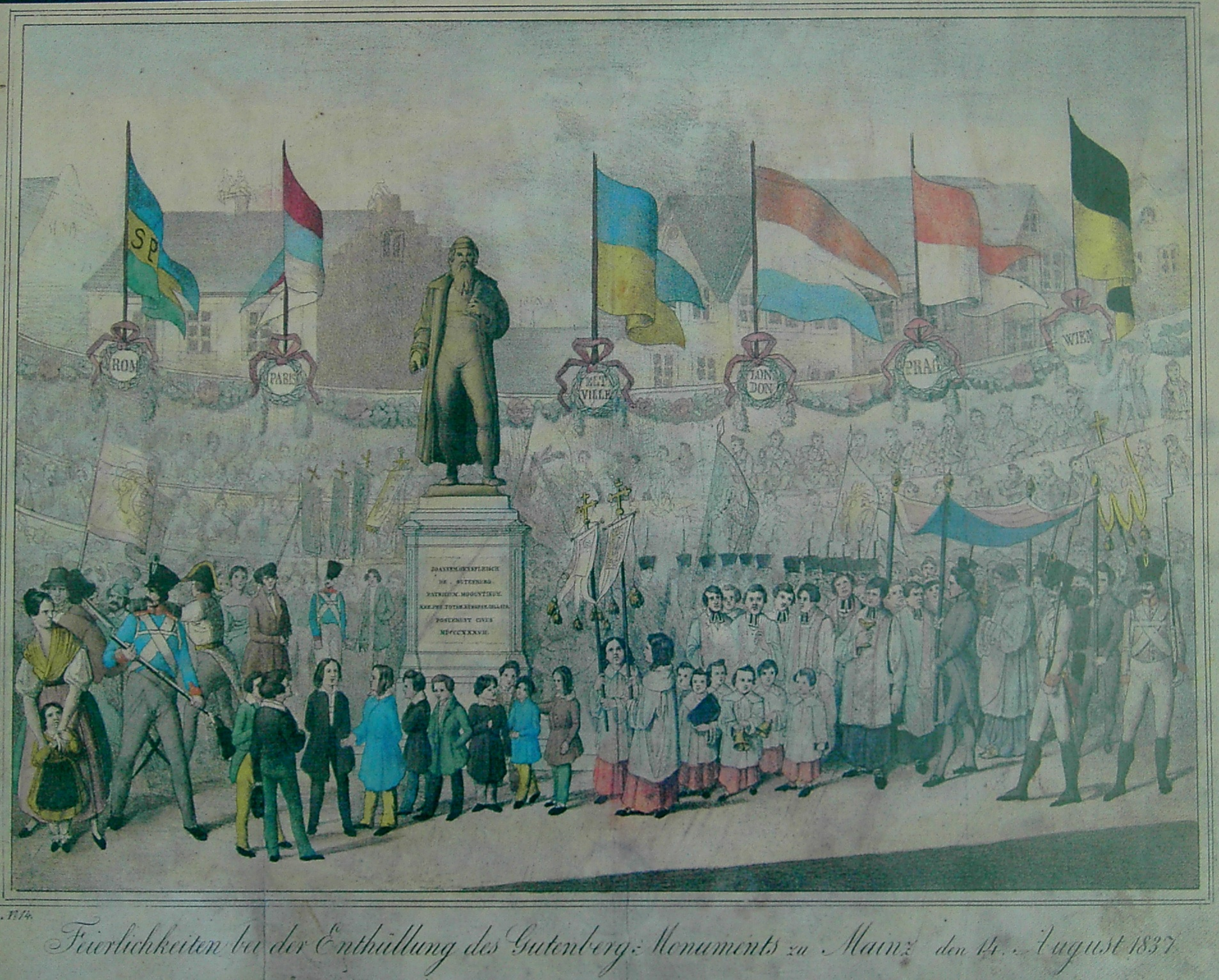
Celebrations at the unveiling of the monument, 1837

By the early 19th century Gutenberg became the subject of Romantic glorification, while the German city of Mainz and the French city of Strasbourg were embroiled in a civic rivalry in the context of the larger nationalist enmity between Germany and France. The cities, both of which he resided in, laid claim to Gutenberg as an icon: Mainz being his birthplace, and Strasbourg being where he allegedly experimented with movable type.

Mainz became the first to honor the inventor with a statue, employing Danish-Icelandic artist Bertel Thorvaldsen, though he did nothing further than make a miniature model of the statue. The statue had been ordered by the city of Mainz, in 1832; and the statue was made from small models by his pupil Herman Wilhelm Bissen and some preparatory drawings. (Note: Plon 1892 credits Thorvaldsen with the preparatory drawings. The website of the city of Mainz instead credits Ludwig Lindenschmit the Elder.) All the work was cast in bronze at Paris, by Charles Crozatier, in 1836; and the monument was inaugurated at Mainz on 14 August 1837. The city, to thank Thorvaldsen, who would not accept any remuneration for his models, made him an honorary citizen. The statue was dedicated in a three-day ceremony attended by delegates from all Germany, although Thorvaldsen himself did not see the monument until 1841.

Thorvaldsen's rival David d'Angers, perhaps provoked by the monument in Mainz, went on to design a statue of Gutenberg in Strasbourg, which was unveiled in 1840.

== Gallery ==
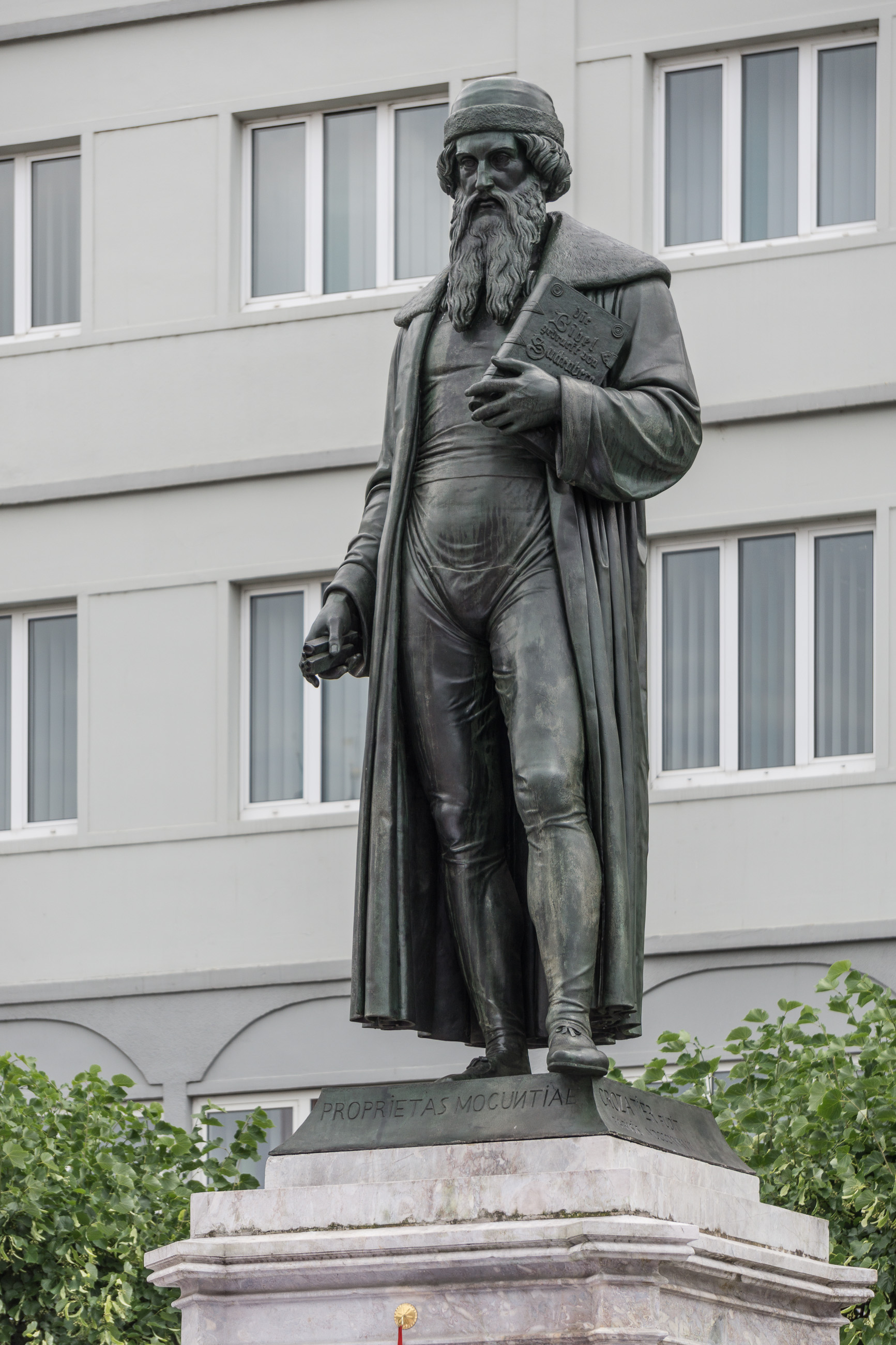
Detail of the statue

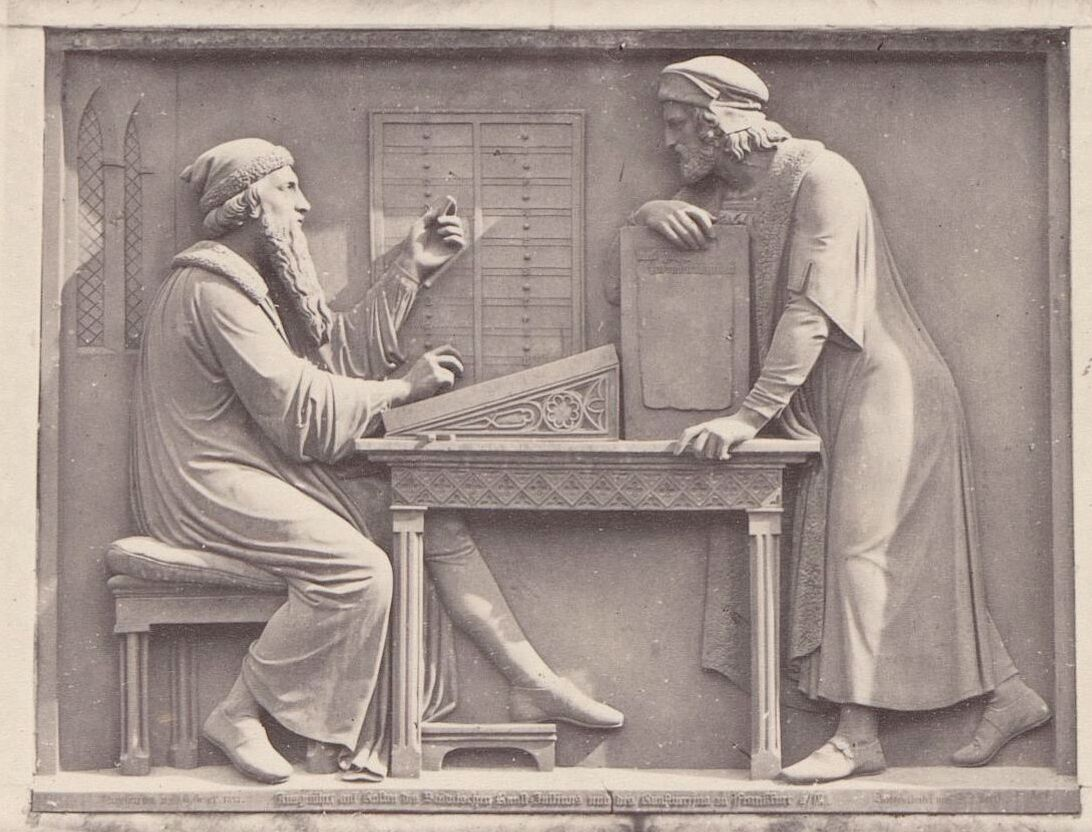
Detail of first bas-relief: Gutenberg showing types to Johann Fust

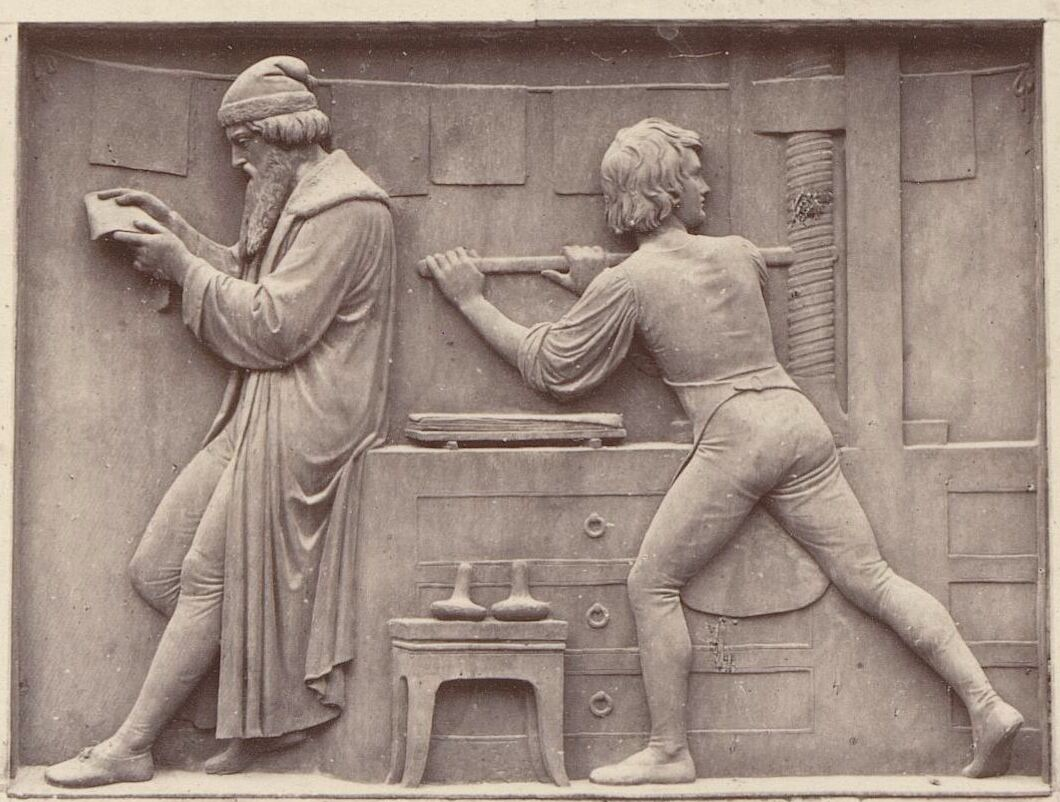
Detail of second bas-relief: Gutenberg at a printing press

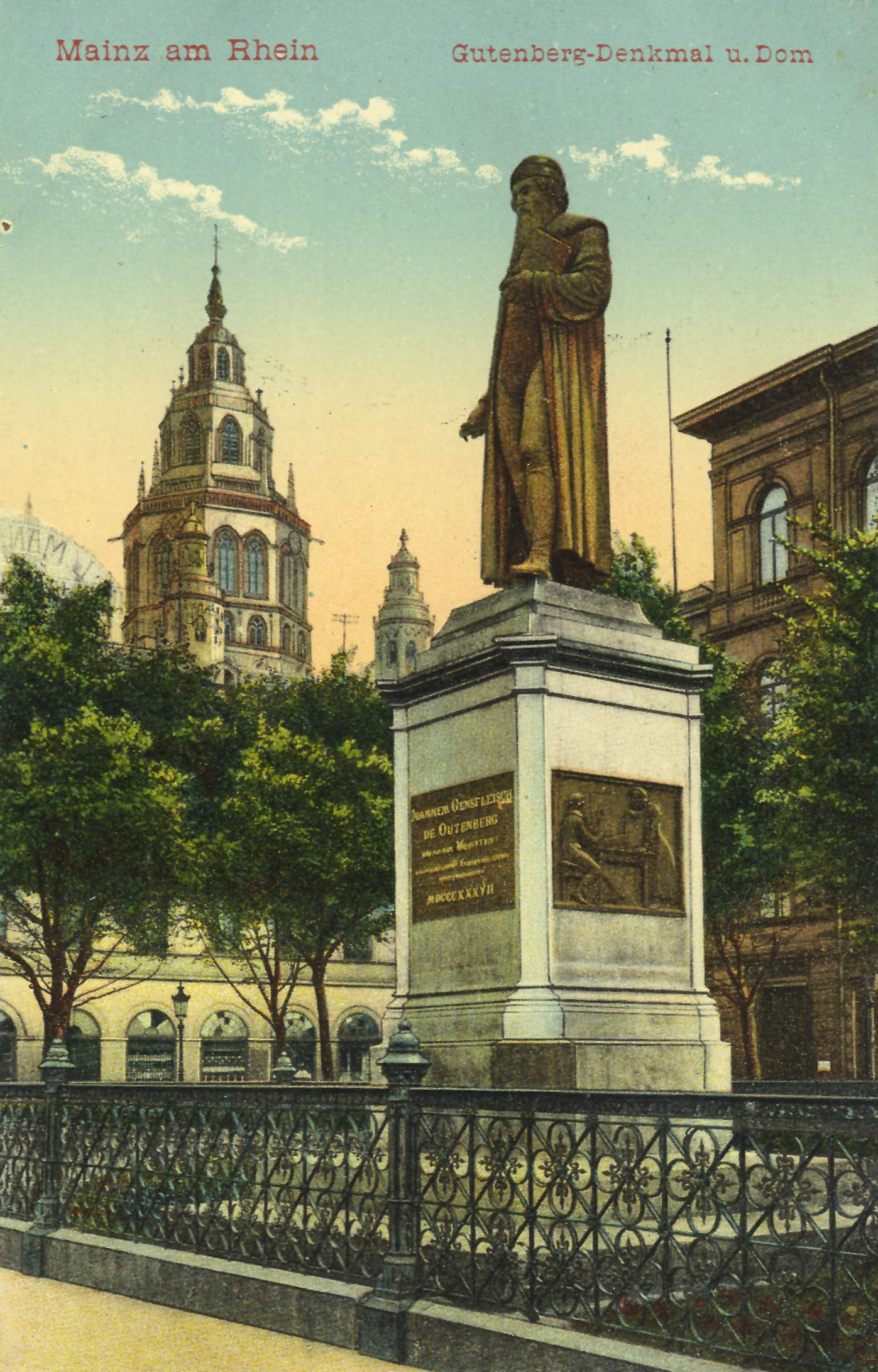
German postcard featuring the monument, c. 1900
