= Gutenbergplatz (Mainz) =

Square in Mainz, Germany

Coordinates: 49.998916°N 8.271503°E

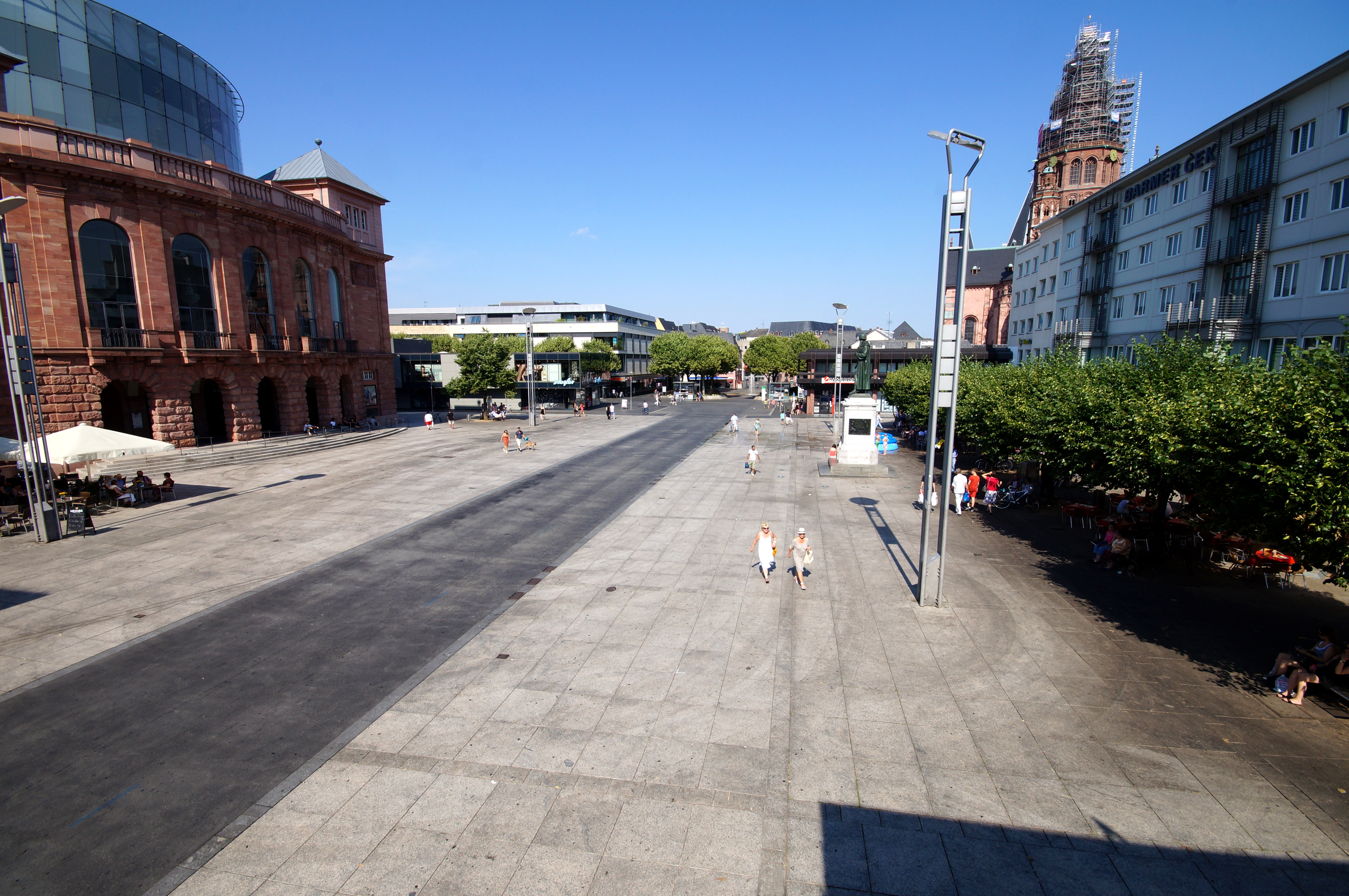
Gutenbergplatz in Mainz-Altstadt: On the left the Staatstheater Mainz is located, on the right the Gutenberg monument on Gutenbergplatz and above it Mainz Cathedral.

The Gutenbergplatz is an important square in the German city of Mainz, in terms of building culture and urban development. It was named after Johannes Gutenberg, who was born in Mainz. Gutenbergplatz is the largest and most important square in the city centre of Mainz. Due to its social and urban history, the square has been designated a monument zone.

== History ==
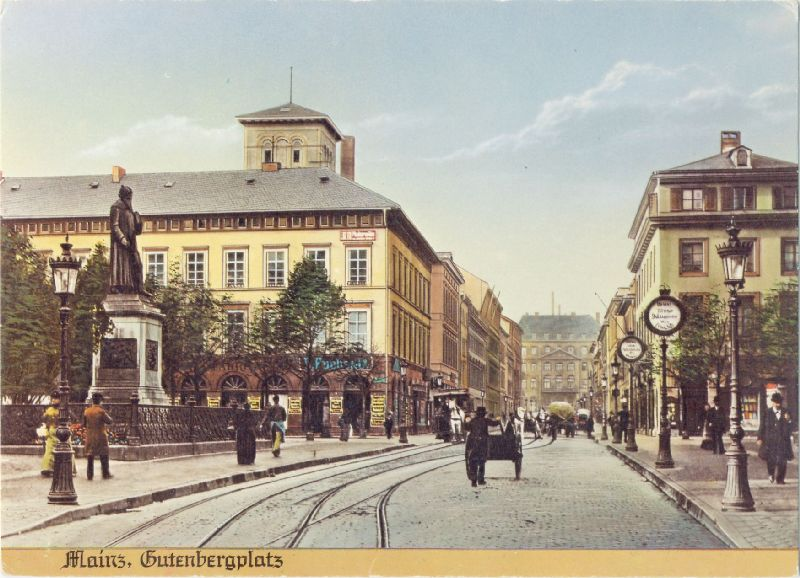
About 1900: Panoramic view in direction Schillerplatz. On the left the Gutenberg Monument, on the floor the rails of the Mainz horse-drawn tramway running from 1883 to 1904.

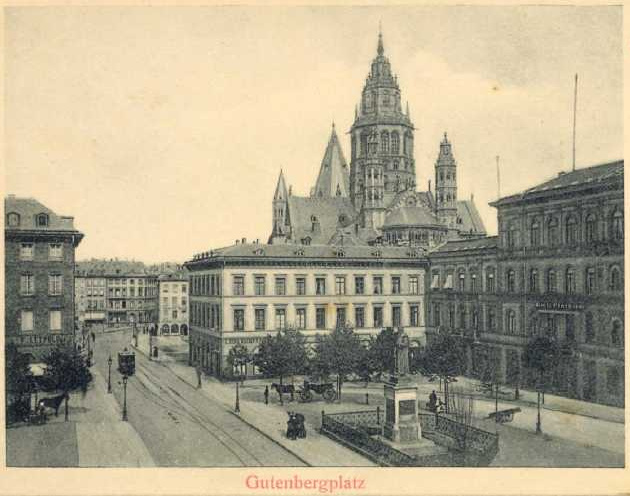
Around 1900: View direction Höfchen and cathedral

Mainz and its inner city were heavily destroyed at the beginning of the 19th century after the coalition wars and the siege of Mainz in 1793. During the occupation of Mainz from 1792 and its integration into the French First Republic from 1801 onwards, Mainz became the capital of the Département du Mont-Tonnerre. On 22 June 1804, Mainz became a Bonne ville de l'Empire français by order of Napoleon Bonaparte. On 1 June 1804, Mainz became the capital of the Département du Mont-Tonnerre. On 1 June 1804, Mainz became a Bonne ville de l'Empire français. In October 1804 Napoleon Bonaparte decided in a decree to build a new boulevard and a representative area in the heart of the city centre of Mainz. The French architect Eustache de Saint-Far was commissioned by Napoleon Bonaparte to plan the redesign of the district. Eustache de Saint-Far became "Ingénieur en chef au corps Impérial des Ponts et Chaussées du Département Mont Tonnerre et de la Sarre" in 1802.

Eustache de Saint-Far planned a street leading from the animal market, today's Schillerplatz, to the new square. The starting point of this street was the Bassenheimer Hof as ″Point de vue″. In 1809 the construction of the street with the name "Grande Rue Napoléon" began, in 1814 the street was renamed "Neue Straße" or new street. Later the street was renamed after Ludwig I. of Hessen-Darmstadt. It still bears the name Ludwigsstraße today. Due to the construction of the street and the Gutenbergplatz, some buildings had to be demolished. The church of the Agnetenkloster, the Sebastians chapel, the Mainz cathedral provost built between 1781 and 1786 by François Ignace Mangin on behalf of cathedral provost Damian Friedrich von der Leyen and the ruins of the Jesuit church built between 1742 and 1746 on behalf of Balthasar Neumann were demolished. Due to the ongoing coalition wars and the associated shortage of money, the large-scale project of a new parade street and an associated square had to be abandoned at the beginning of construction.

The area of the planned Gutenbergplatz was severely devastated by the destruction during the war, and there were some ruins on the square. Brigade General Rudolf Eickemeyer therefore prepared an expert opinion dated 20 March 1801 "On the execution of the plan for the reconstruction of the part of the city of Mainz burnt down by the Austro-Prussian siege in the area of the cathedral church". Only one building on the square was completed before the project was abandoned. Most of the construction of the square took place under the supervision of the city architect Augustin Wetter in a new attempt from 1819. At this time the architect and city planner Georg Moller also contributed significantly. According to scientific research under Moller's influence the south side of the square was probably designed particularly monumentally and in a uniform style. According to his plans, Belvedere towers were also to be attached to buildings on Gutenbergplatz. However, this was only realised on the building at Gutenbergplatz 2. At the end of the 19th century, Ludwigsstraße was finally completely built. Building on Gutenbergplatz continued until the 1870s. Most of the details in the building plans of Eustache de Saint-Far were still kept, although he had already been dead for about 50 years. Exceptions were the closed arcades and the missing balconies at the Gutenbergplatz. In 1873, a representative building was erected opposite today's Staatstheater Mainz. His styles from the Neo-Renaissance created an architectural interplay with the theater on the other side of the square.

During the Second World War, both Ludwigsstrasse and Gutenbergplatz were damaged. In the post-war period after the Second World War in Germany, reconstruction began. Among other things, the theatre was rebuilt, and in 1950 the two-storey pavilion Gutenbergplatz 16 was erected on old cellar remains at the south-east end of the square. The architect of this building was Kurt Barth. Many other buildings at Gutenbergplatz were built in the following years on the model of the Gutenbergplatz 16 building. From 1961, Ludwigsstrasse was widened according to plans by Ernst May. The low ridge development on Ludwigsstrasse designed by Richard Jörg and Adolf Bayer created a line of sight to Mainz Cathedral. Numerous two-storey pavilions were erected on Gutenbergplatz during these expansion measures.

== Architecture ==
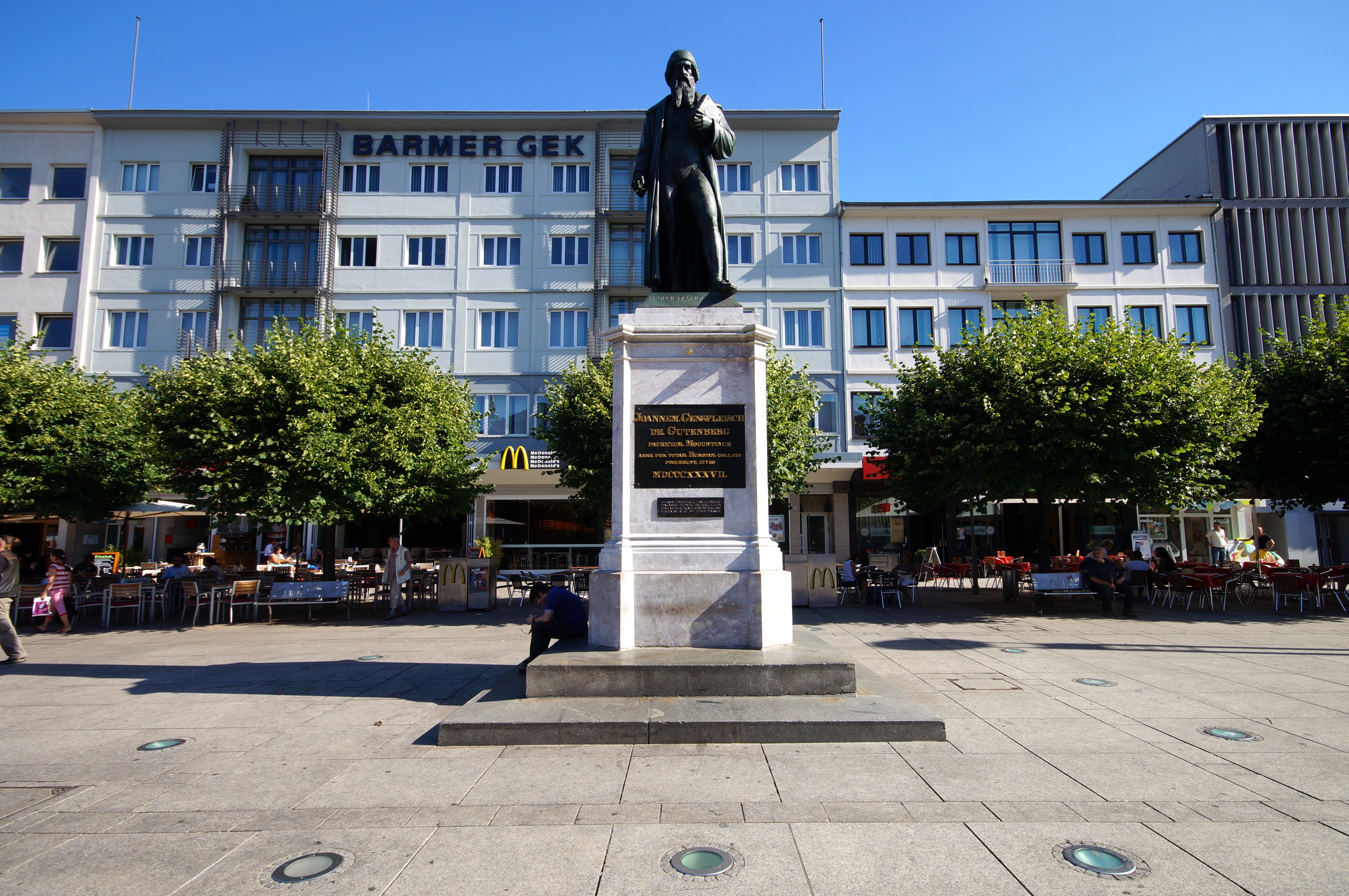
The Gutenberg-monument in the middle of the Gutenbergplatz; 2013

The Gutenbergplatz is located in the heart of Mainz city centre. To the east, the square visually introduces to the row of squares around Mainz Cathedral. Initially, it was planned to combine the squares Höfchen and Markt into an oval square. This was intended to be visually highlighted by small radial streets. However, these plans were not realized. According to Eustache de Saint-Far's plans, the southern part of the square was to end at a new street leading to a courthouse to be built. On the opposite side, the Mainz Theatre was completed in 1833 after four years of construction. From 1837, the centre of the square was the Gutenberg monument designed by Bertel Thorvaldsen and cast by Charles Crozatier. To the west, Ludwigsstrasse leads to Schillerplatz with the Fastnachtsbrunnen (carnival fountain) and the Bassenheimer Hof.

In designing Gutenbergplatz, Eustache de Saint-Far took inspiration from the buildings of Jean-Nicolas-Louis Durand. His collaborator François-Auguste Cheussey had studied with Durand. According to his plans, the square was to have a square floor plan and its centre was to be marked by a monument. The monument was to be surrounded by colonnades, Eustache de Saint-Far called it "pour les temps de foire". The edges of the square were to be architecturally accentuated by arcades. Mainz Cathedral is visible from Gutenbergplatz. The present appearance of Gutenbergplatz and Ludwigsstraße was decisively influenced by Ernst May.

== Trivia ==
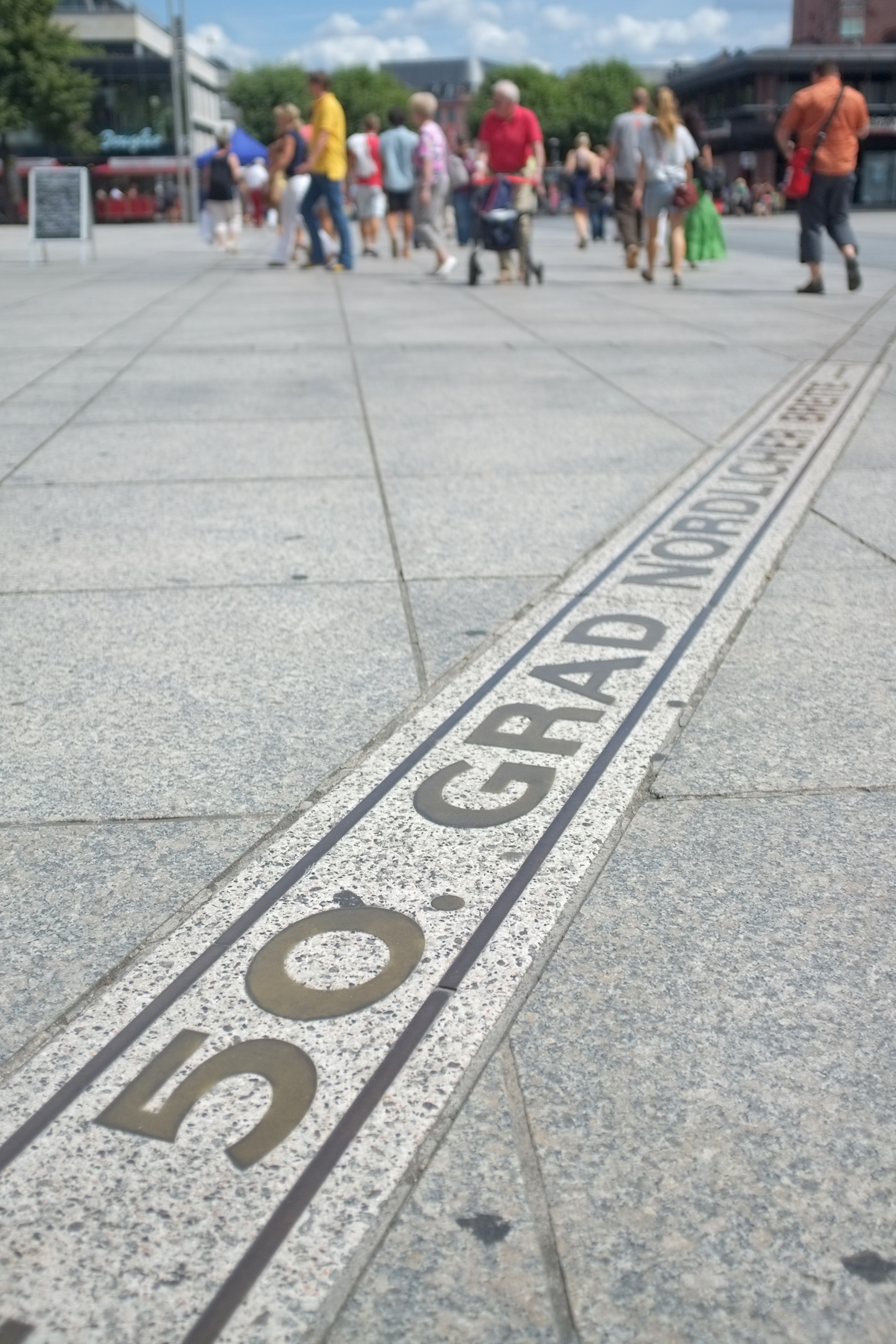
Marking of the 50th degree of latitude

50 degrees north latitude off Gutenbergplatz

Near the square runs the 50th parallel north, which runs across the city centre of Mainz. It is said that several buildings and Gutenbergplatz itself are crossed directly by the 50th degree of latitude. In fact, however, only the Staatstheater Mainz is affected a few metres away. An optical course of the degree of latitude is marked in the planum of the square by two parallel metal rails for tourist purposes, between which the following inscription is placed with bronze letters: 50. GRAD NÖRDLICHER BREITE. A stylized globe, also embedded, marks the course of the latitude on the globe.
