= Statue of Johannes Gutenberg, Strasbourg =

Statue by David d'Angers

Statue of Johannes Gutenberg
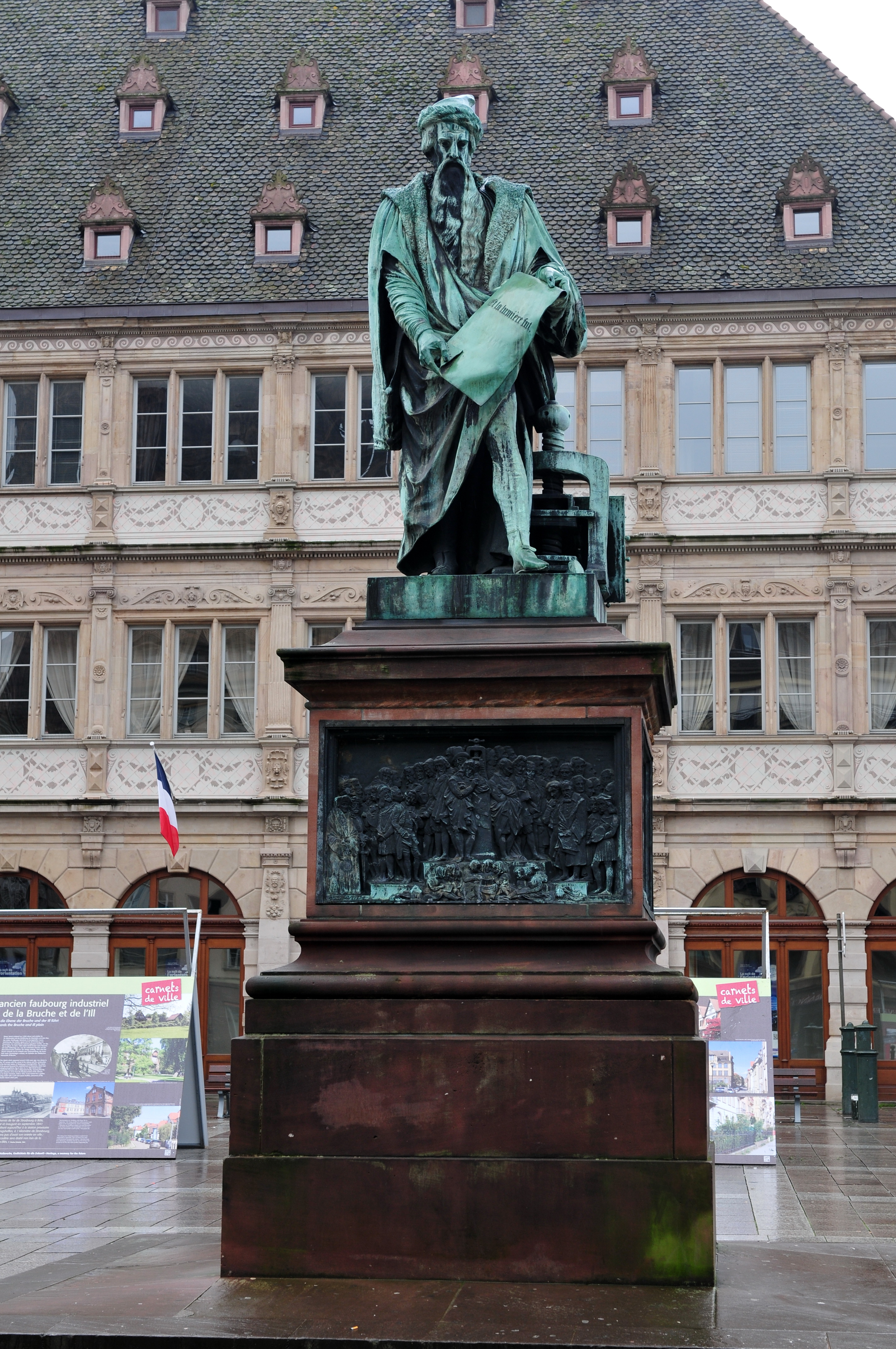
- Pictured in 2014
- Artist: David d'Angers
- Year: 1840 (186 years ago)
- Subject: Johannes Gutenberg
- Location: Place Gutenberg Strasbourg, France; 48°34′52″N 7°44′55″E

A statue of Johannes Gutenberg by David d'Angers is installed on Place Gutenberg in Strasbourg, France. It was unveiled in 1840.
