= Statue of Johannes Gutenberg (Stanford University) =

Statue in Stanford, California, U.S.

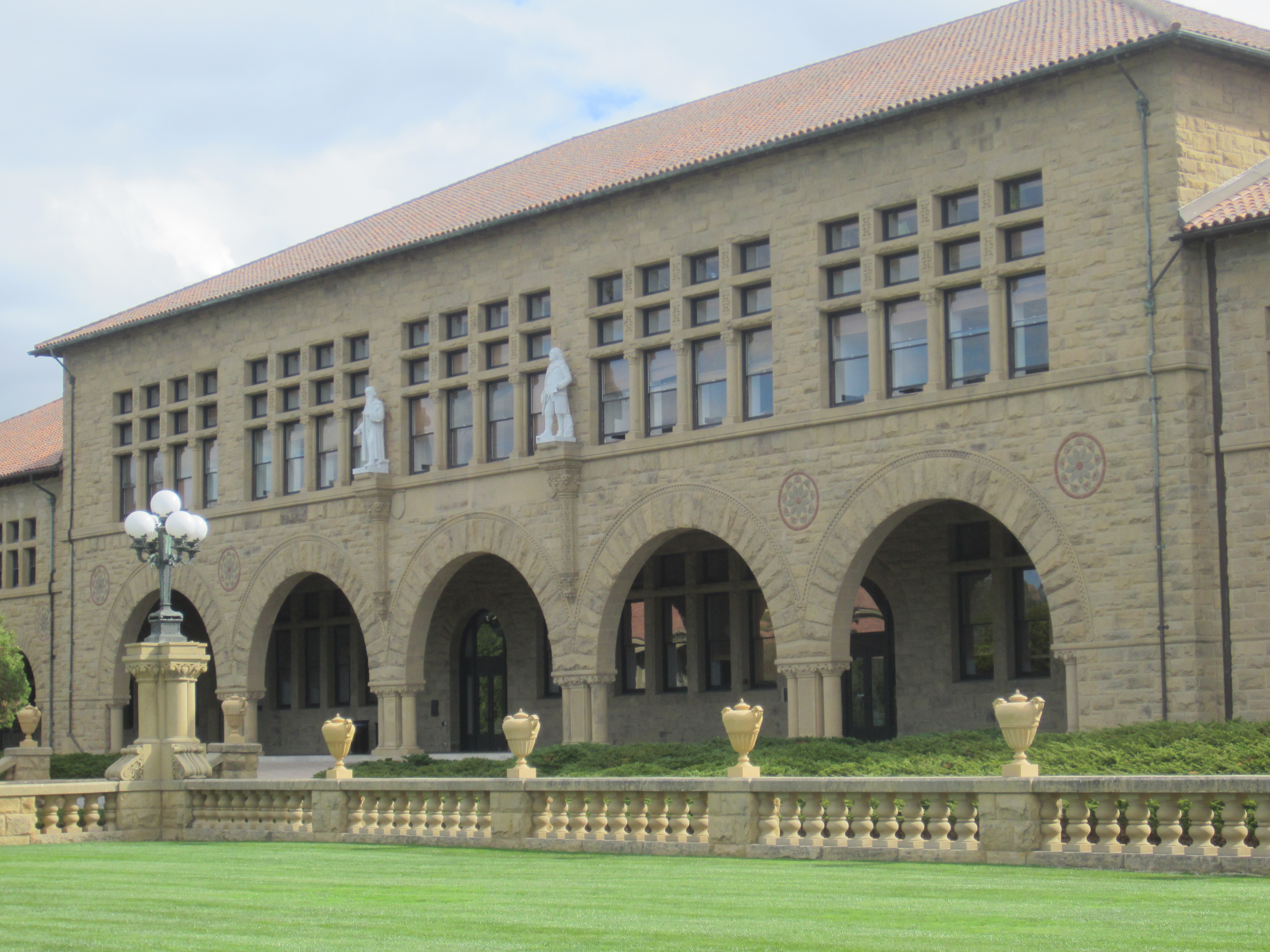
- Statues of Johannes Gutenberg (left) and Benjamin Franklin (right) on the exterior of Wallenberg Hall, 2018
- Medium: Marble sculpture
- Subject: Johannes Gutenberg
- Location: Stanford, California, United States; 37.42839°N 122.16896°W

A statue of Johannes Gutenberg is installed on the Stanford University campus in Stanford, California, United States.

== History ==
The original marble by Italian sculptor Antonio Frilli was removed in 1949, along with another by Frilli depicting Benjamin Franklin. The two statues were replaced by new sculptures by Palo Alto artist Oleg Lobykin in 2013. The statues of Franklin and Gutenberg were installed on perches on the exterior of Wallenberg Hall.

== See also ==
- 2013 in art
