= David d'Angers =

French sculptor and medallist (1788–1856)

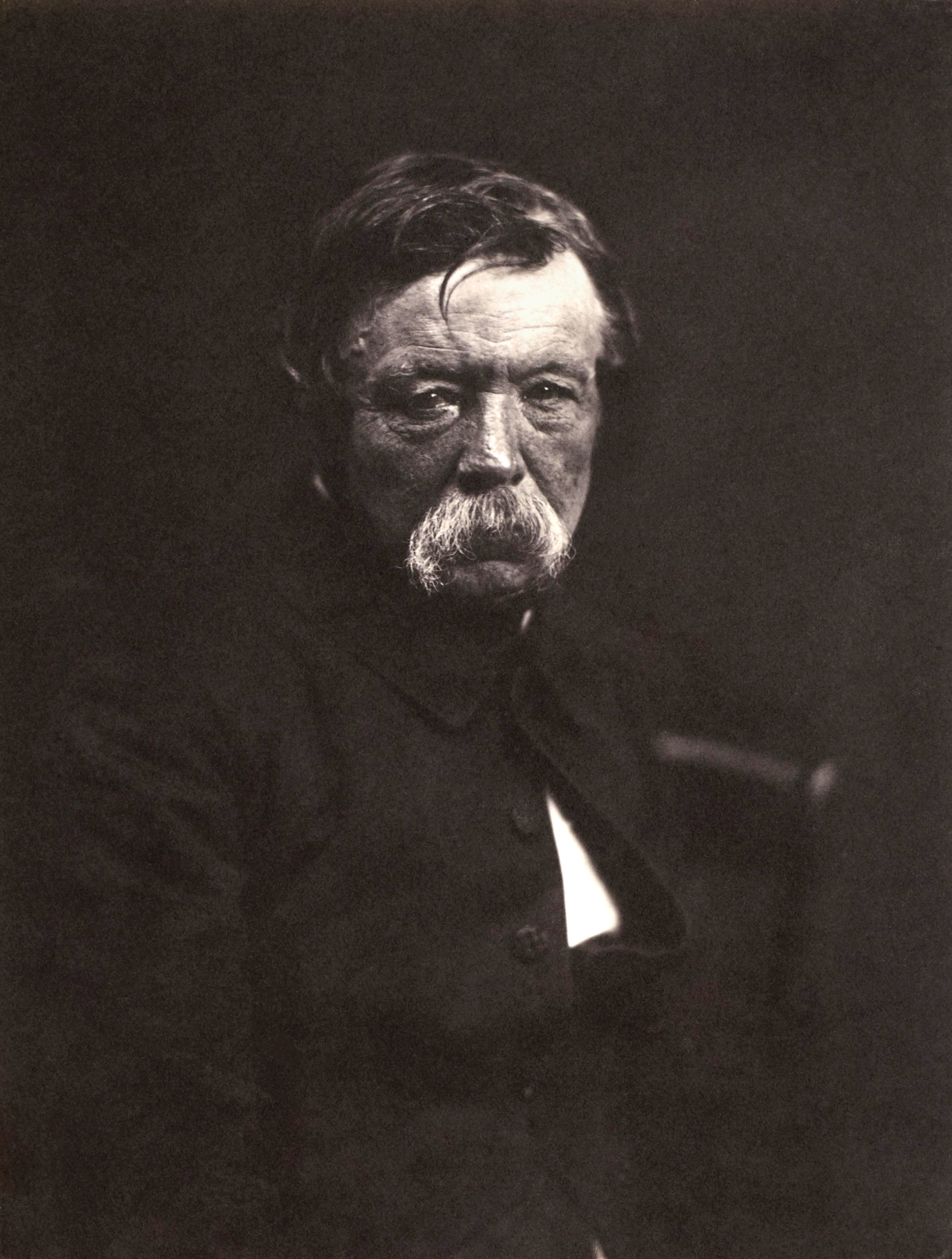
- David d'Angers in 1853, photograph by Édouard Baldus
- Born: Pierre-Jean David; 12 March 1788; Angers, France
- Died: 4 January 1856 (aged 67); Paris, France
- Occupations: sculptor and medallist

Pierre-Jean David (English: /dɒ̃ˈʒeɪ/ dahn-ZHAY, French: [david dɑ̃ʒe]; 12 March 1788 – 4 January 1856) was a French sculptor, medalist and active freemason. He adopted the name David d'Angers, following his entry into the studio of the painter Jacques-Louis David in 1809 as a way of both expressing his patrimony and distinguishing himself from the master painter.

== Biography ==
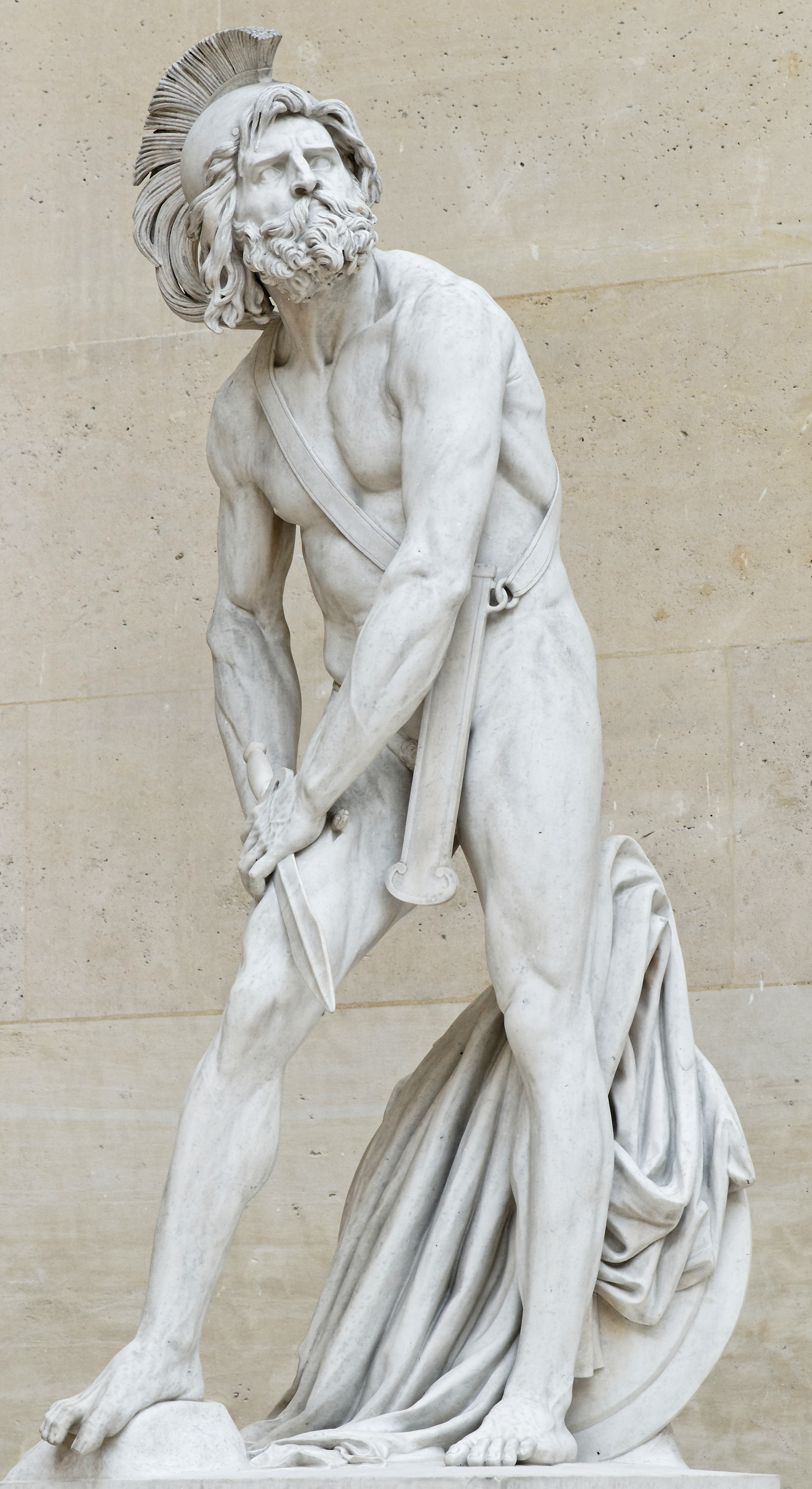
David's Wounded Philopoemen in the Louvre

Pierre-Jean David was born in Angers in 1788. His father was a wood carver and ornamental sculptor, who had joined the volunteer Republican army as a musketeer, fighting against the Chouans of La Vendée. He studied in the studio of Jean-Jacques Delusse and in 1808 traveled to Paris to study in the studio of Philippe-Laurent Roland.

While in Paris he did work both on the Arc de Triomphe and the exterior of the Louvre. In 1810 he succeeded in taking the second place prize at the École des Beaux-Arts for his Othryades. In 1811 David's La Douleur won the École's competition for tête d'expression followed by his taking of the Prix de Rome for his Epaminondas in the same year. He spent five years in Rome, during which time he frequented the studio of Antonio Canova and made small trips around Italy to Venice, Naples and Florence.

Returning from Rome around the time of the restoration of the Bourbons and their accompanying foreign conquerors and returned royalists, David d'Angers would not remain in the neighborhood of the Tuileries, opting instead to travel to London. Here John Flaxman and others took him to task for the political sins of David the painter, to whom he was erroneously supposed to be related.

With great difficulty he made his way to Paris again, where a comparatively prosperous career opened before him. His medallions and busts were in much request, as well as orders for monumental works. One of the most famous of these was that of Gutenberg at Strassburg, which stands in Strasbourg's Place Gutenberg; but those he himself valued most were the statue of Barra (Joseph Bara), a drummer boy who purportedly continued to beat his drum until the moment of death in the war in La Vendée, and the monument to the Greek liberator Markos Botsaris.

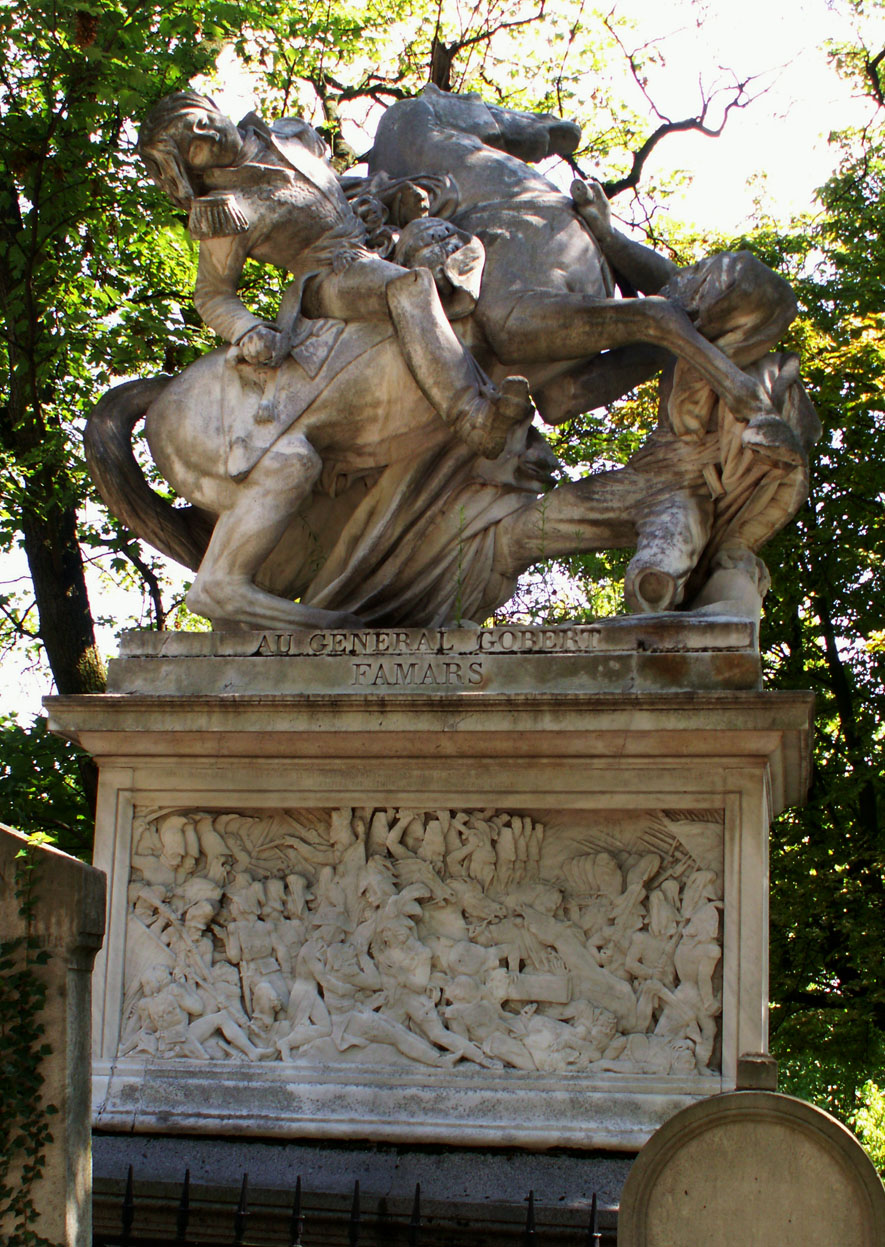
Monument to General Gobert (Père Lachaise)

David's busts and medallions were very numerous, and among his sitters may be found not only the illustrious men and women of France, but many others both of England and Germany countries which he visited professionally in 1827 and 1829. His medallions number over 500.

In 1828, David created a bust of Gilbert du Motier, Marquis de Lafayette and presented it to the United States Congress via President John Quincy Adams. In his letter to President Adams, David requested that the bust be placed

in the Hall of Congress, near the monument erected to Washington; the son by the side of the father, or, rather, that the two brothers in arms, the two companions in victory, the two men of order and of law, should not be more separated in our admiration than they were in their wishes and in their perils.

Lafayette is one of the ties that connect the two worlds. A few months since he revisited your land, consecrated by justice and equality, and you restored him to us, honored by your hospitality and your homage.

In my turn, I restore him to you; or, rather, I only restore to you his image, for he himself must remain with us, in order to recall frequently to the national councils those eternal principles on which the independence of nations reposes and the hopes of mankind are built.

The bust was accepted and displayed, but was destroyed in the fire that consumed much of the Library of Congress on December 24, 1851.

David's fame rests firmly on his pedimental sculpture for the Pantheon, his marble Wounded Philopoemen in the Louvre and his equestrian monument to General Jacques-Nicolas Gobert in Père Lachaise Cemetery. In addition to that of Gobert, he did sculptures for seven other tombs at Père Lachaise, including the bronze busts of writer Honoré de Balzac and physician Samuel Hahnemann.

In the Musée David in Angers is an almost complete collection of his works either in the form of copies or in the original moulds. As an example of his benevolence of character may be mentioned his rushing off to the sickbed of Rouget de Lisle, the author of the Marseillaise Hymn, modelling and carving him in marble without delay, making a lottery of the work, and sending to the poet in the extremity of need the proceeds.

Of Reviving Greece, his monument to the Greek liberator Markos Botsaris, showing a Greek child reading his name, Victor Hugo said, "It is difficult to see anything more beautiful in the world; this statue joins the grandeur of Pheidias to the expressive manner of Puget."

== Museums ==
- David d'Angers gallery, Musée des Beaux-Arts, Angers
- Musée Carnavalet, Paris
- Musée de la Vie romantique, Paris

== Selected works ==
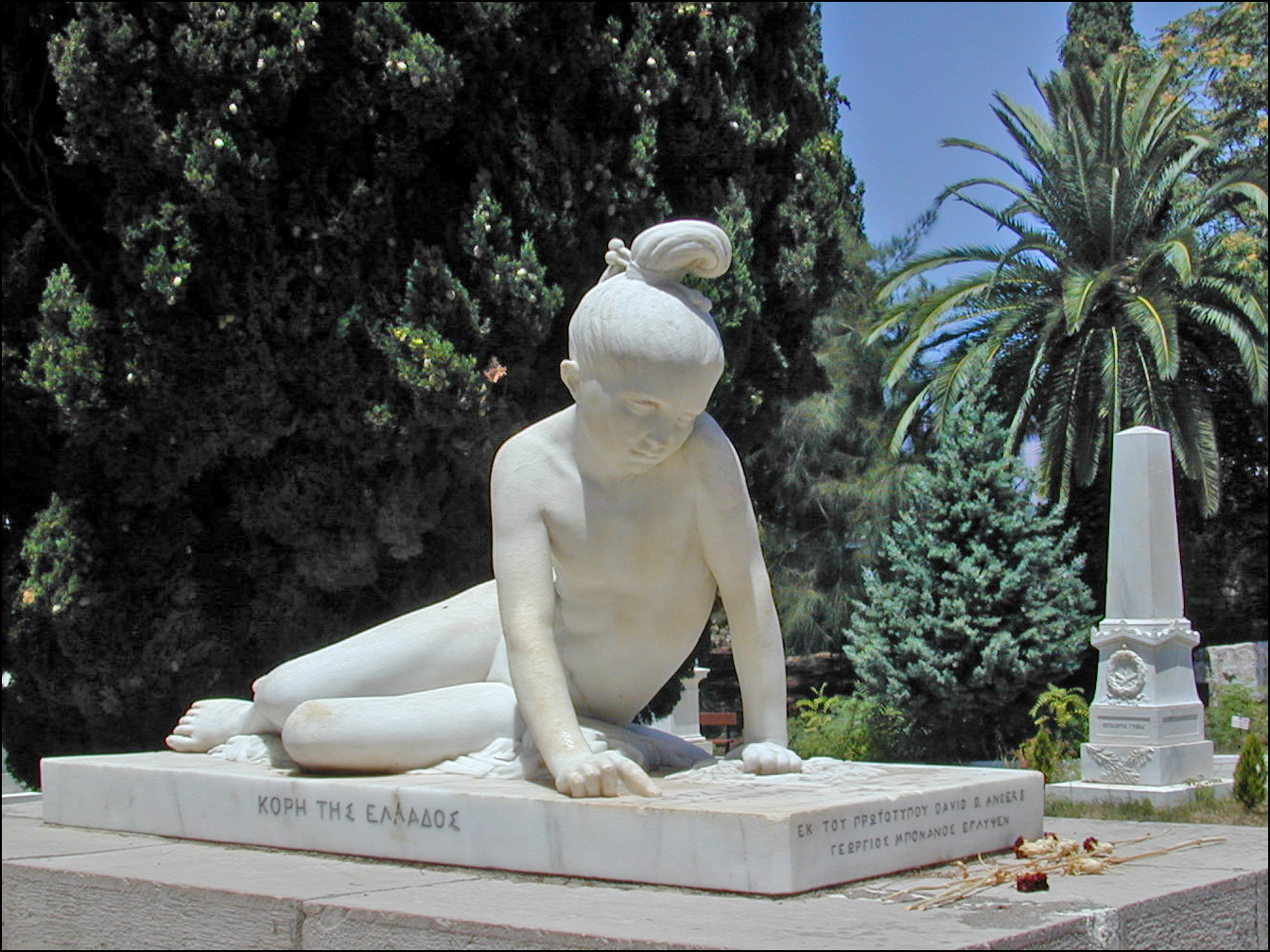
Reviving Greece, his monument to the Greek liberator Markos Botsaris

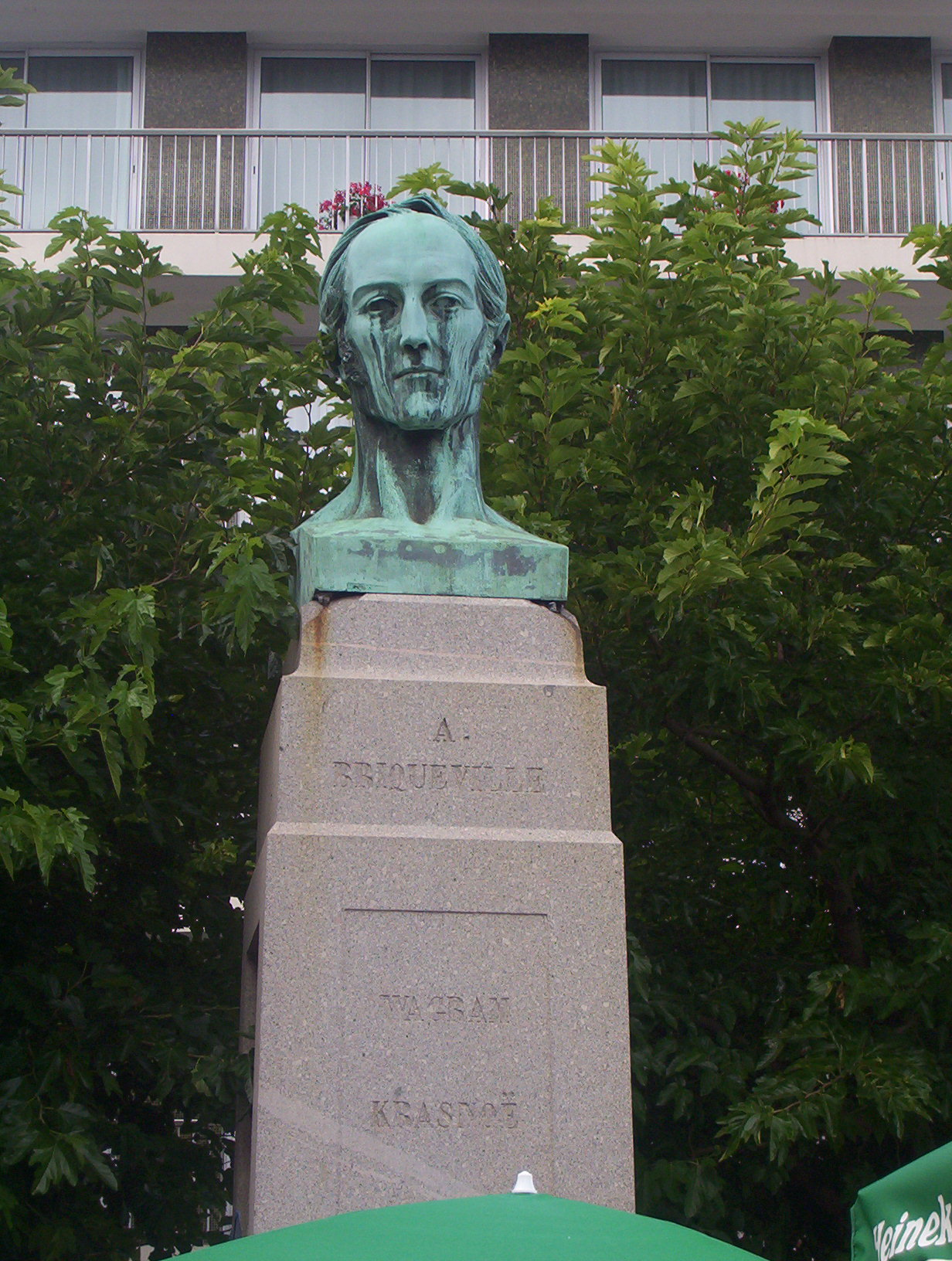
Bust of Armand de Bricqueville, Cherbourg-Octeville

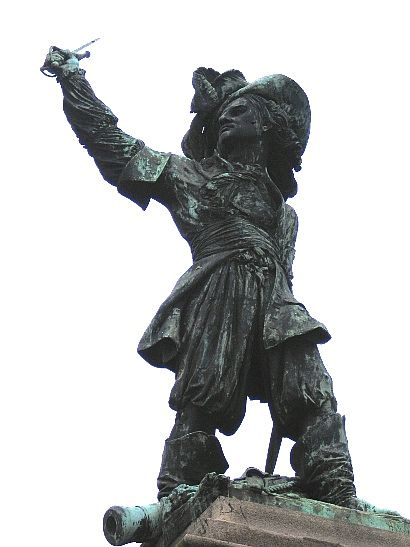
Statue of Jean Bart in Dunkerque

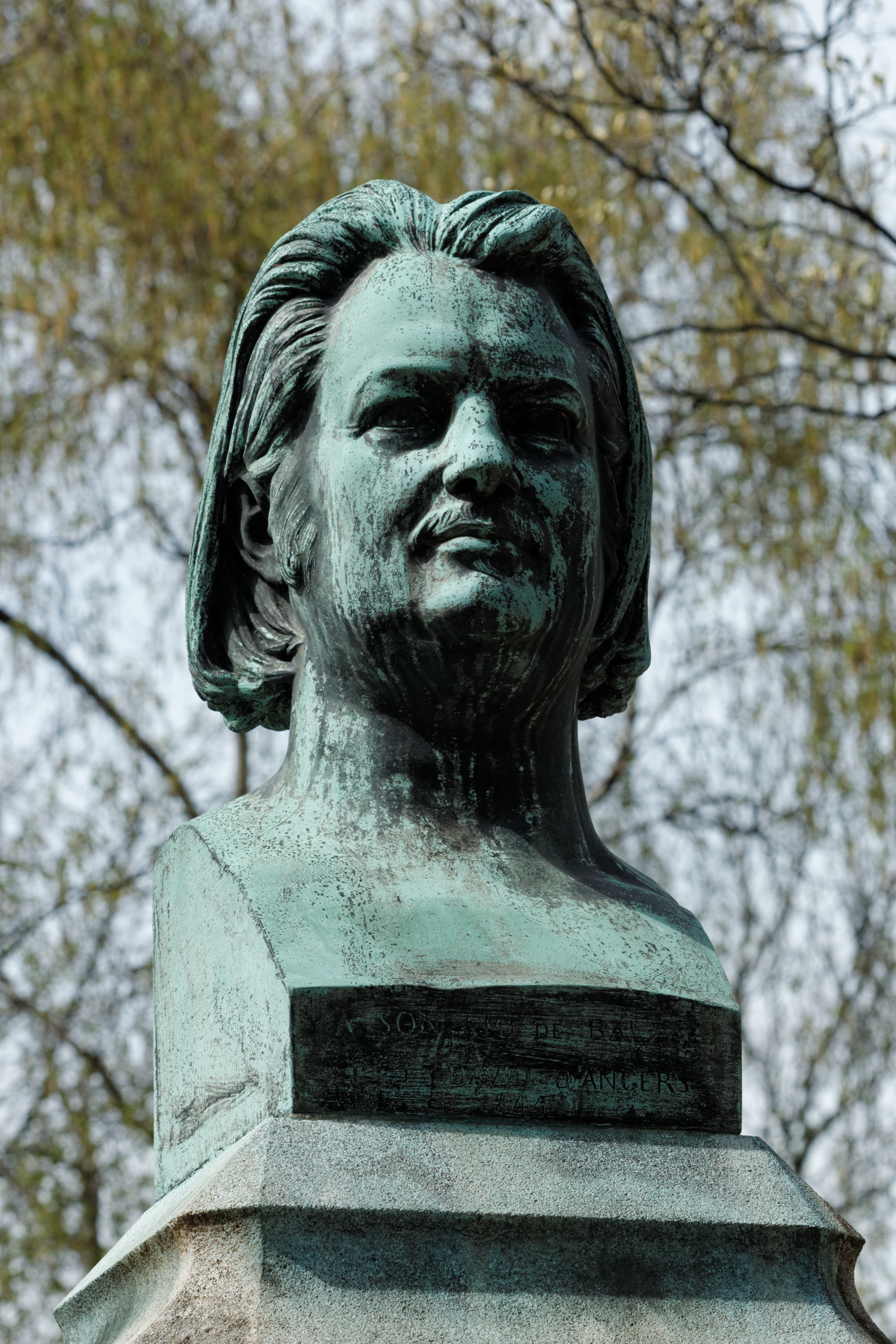
Bust of Honoré de Balzac, cimetière du Père-Lachaise

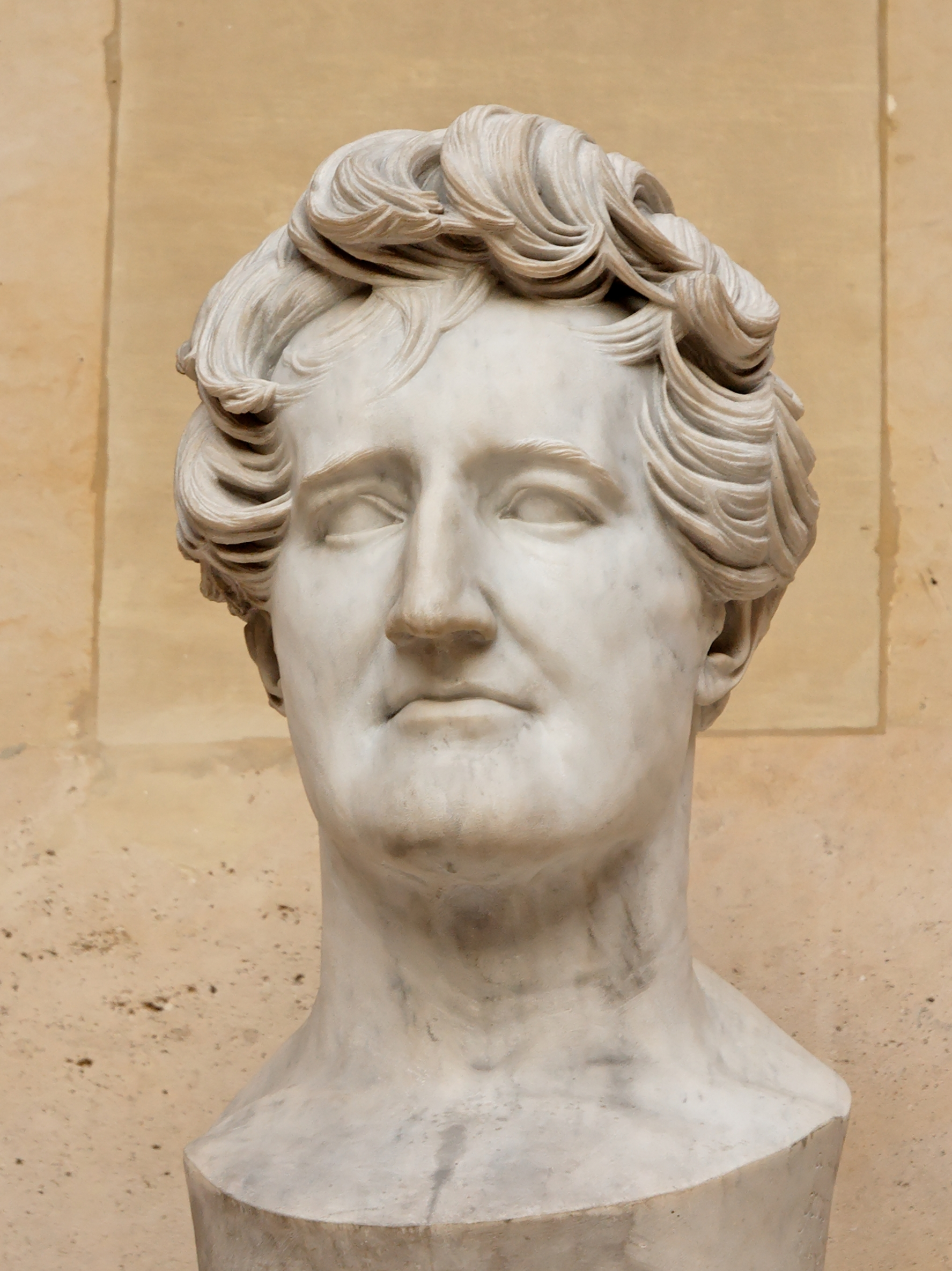
Bust of Georges Cuvier, musée du Louvre

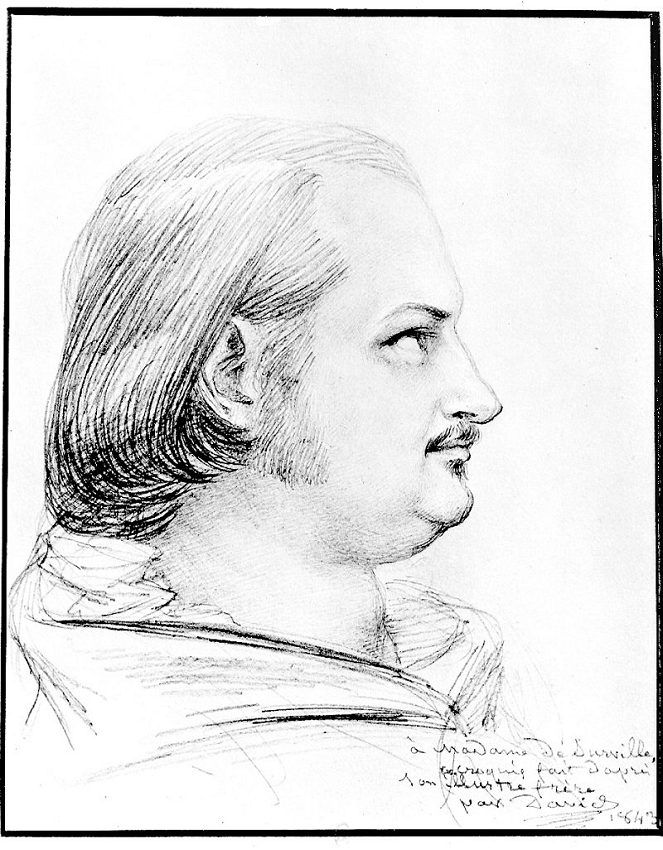
Portrait of Honoré de Balzac

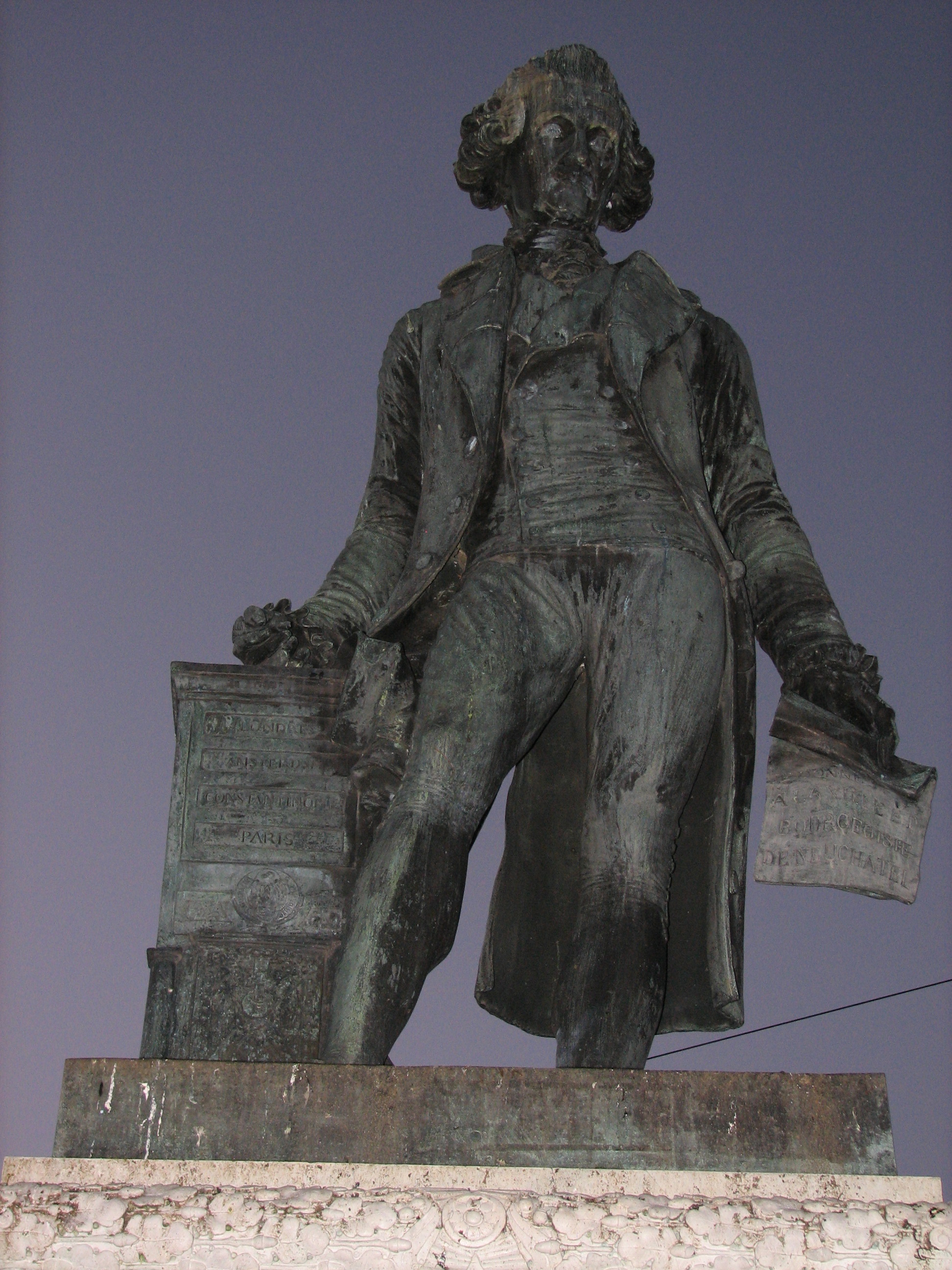
Statue of David de Pury

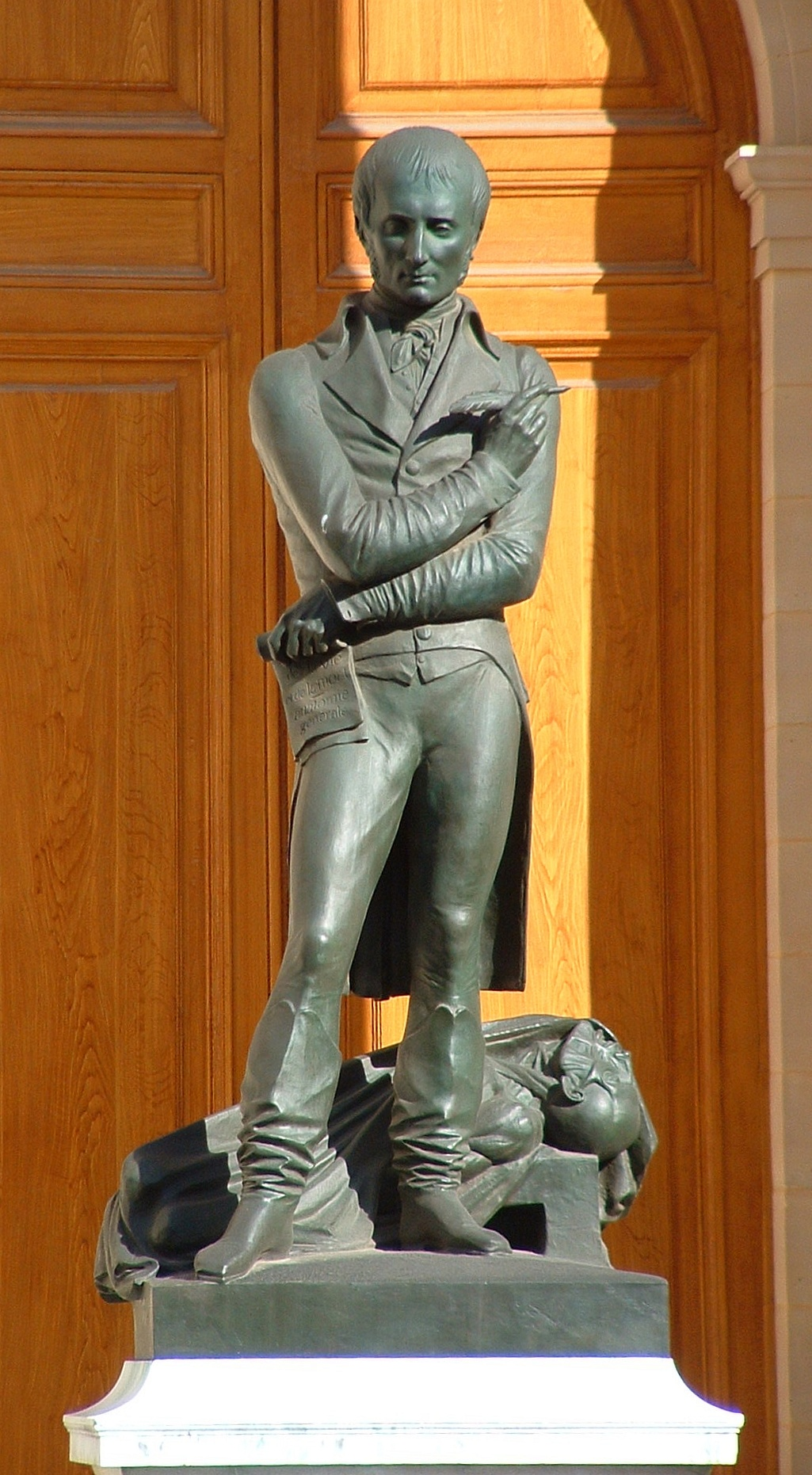
Statue de Xavier Bichat, Paris Descartes University

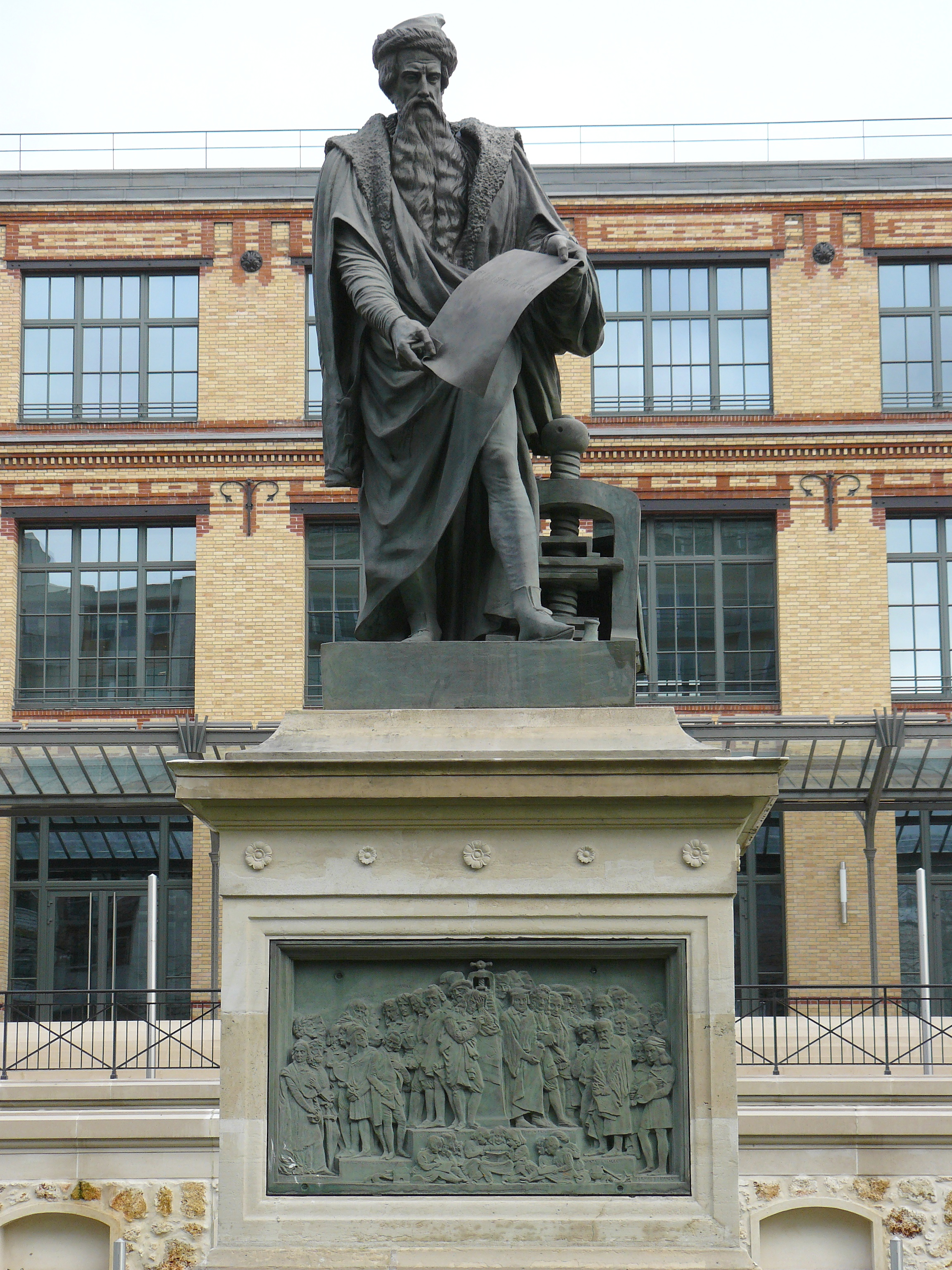
Statue of Gutenberg, Imprimerie nationale, Paris

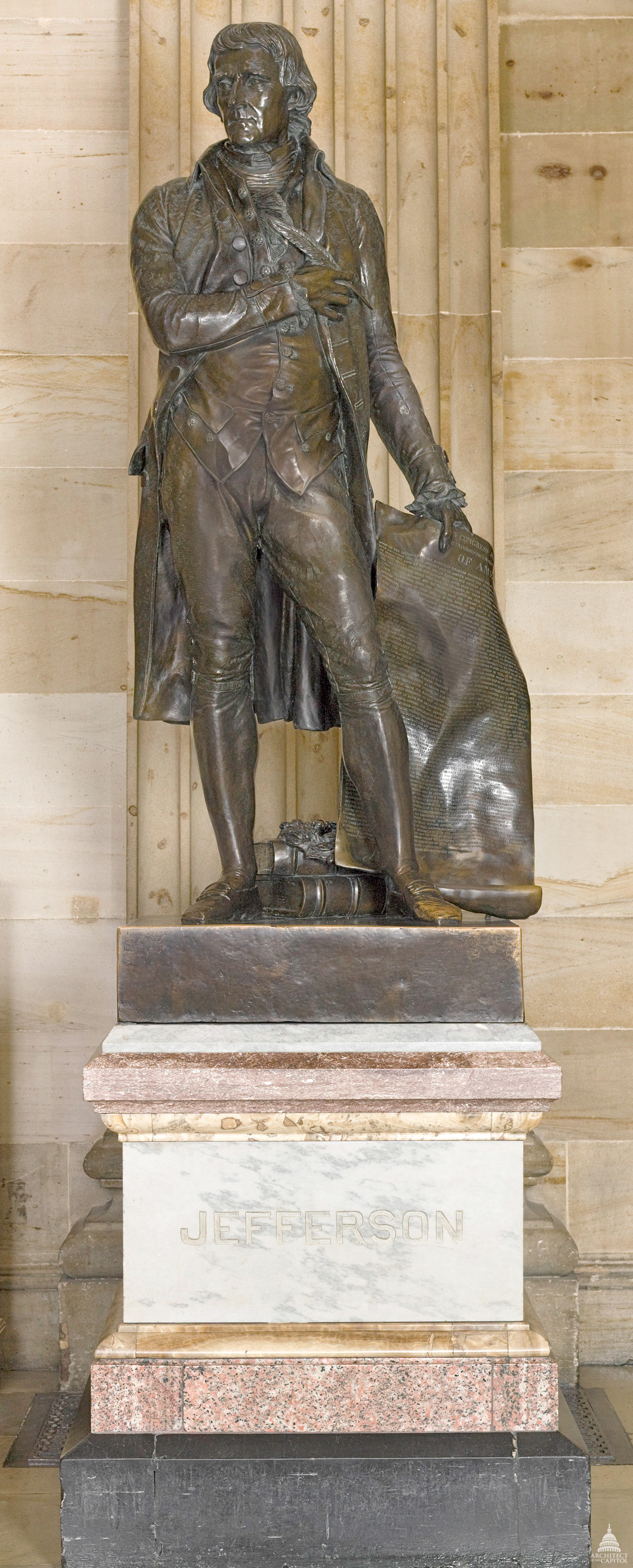
Thomas Jefferson, 1834, in the Rotunda of the U.S. Capitol

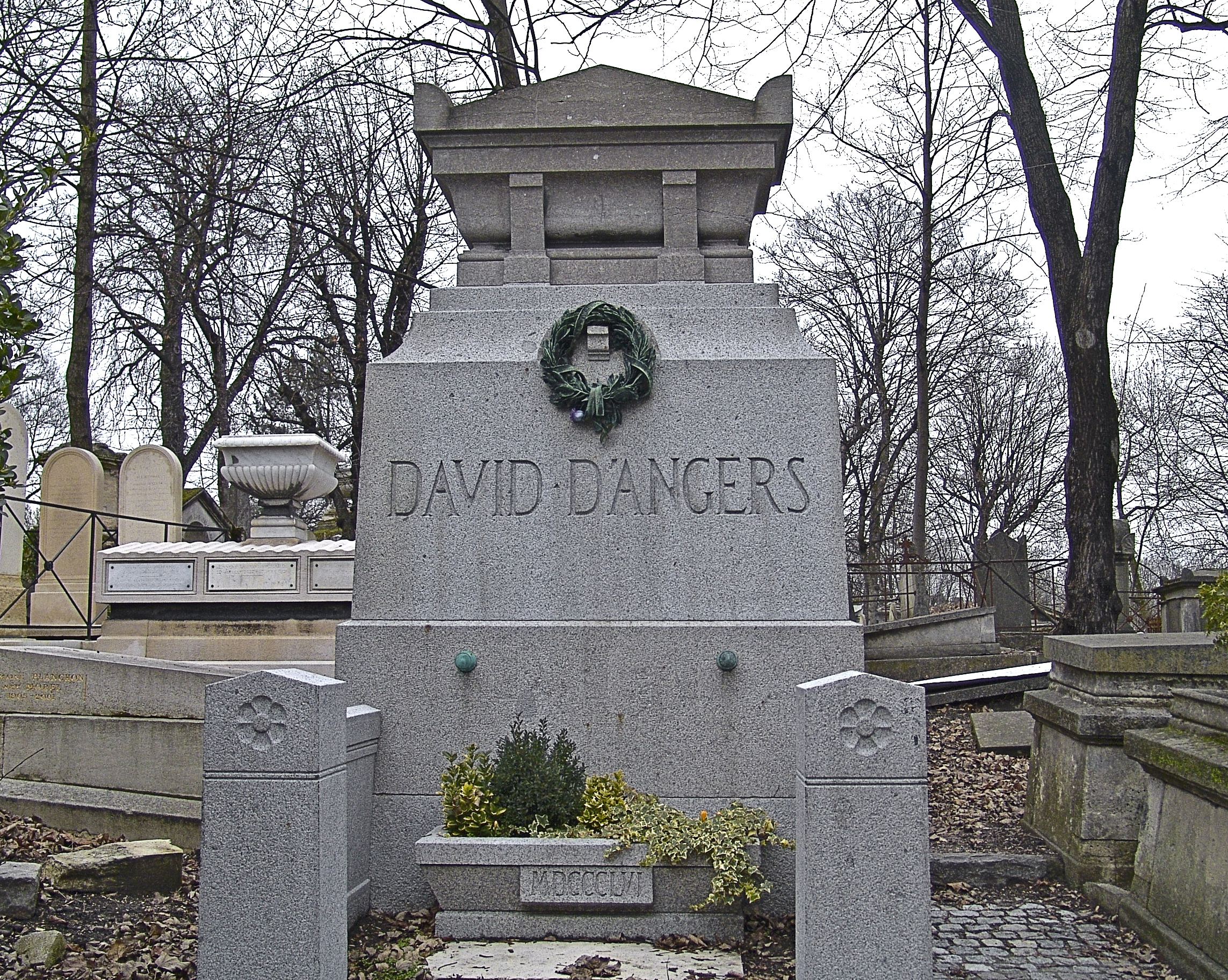
Tomb of David d'Angers – Père Lachaise Cemetery

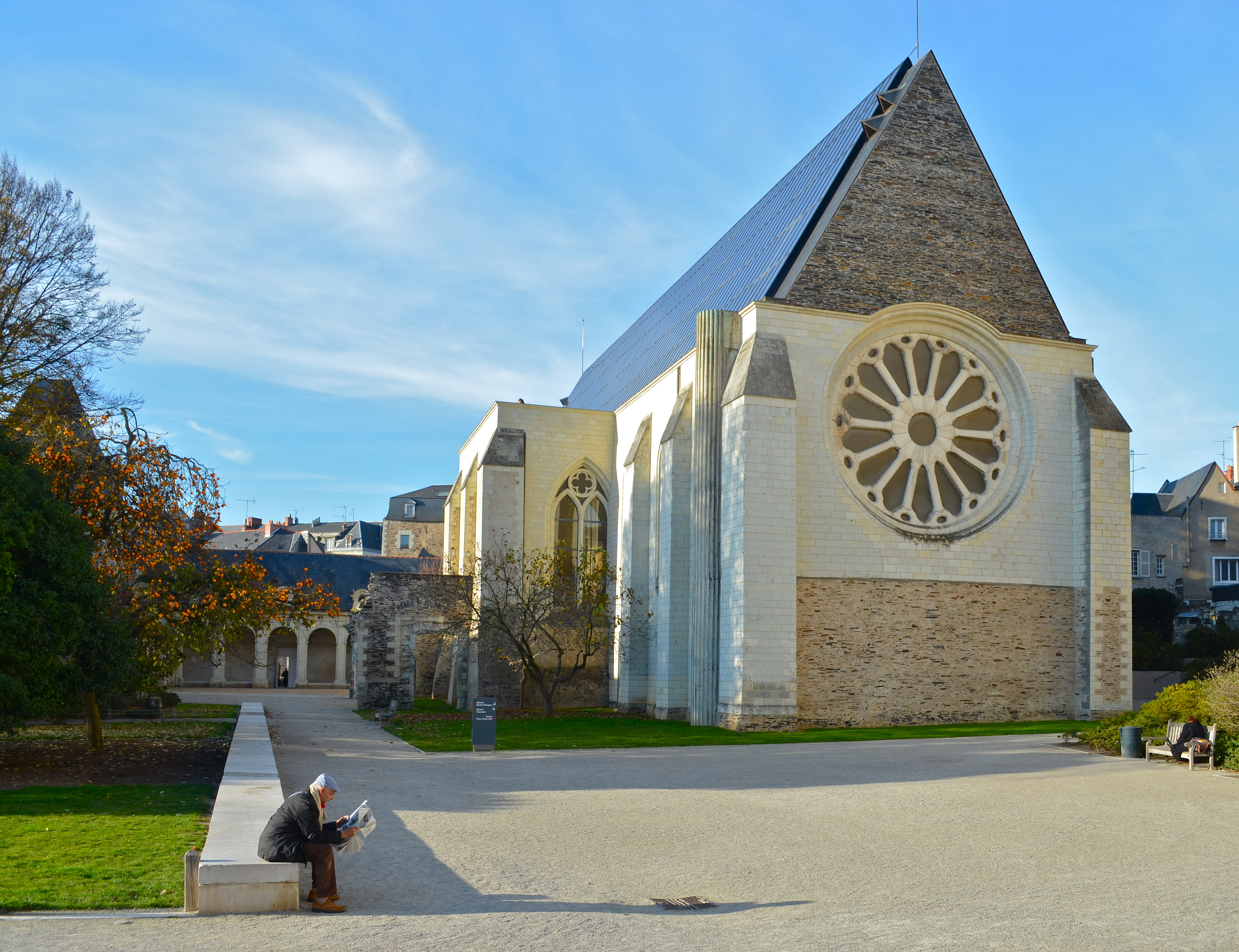
The Musée David d'Angers, in the former Toussaint Abbey, Angers
Gallery of illustrious men

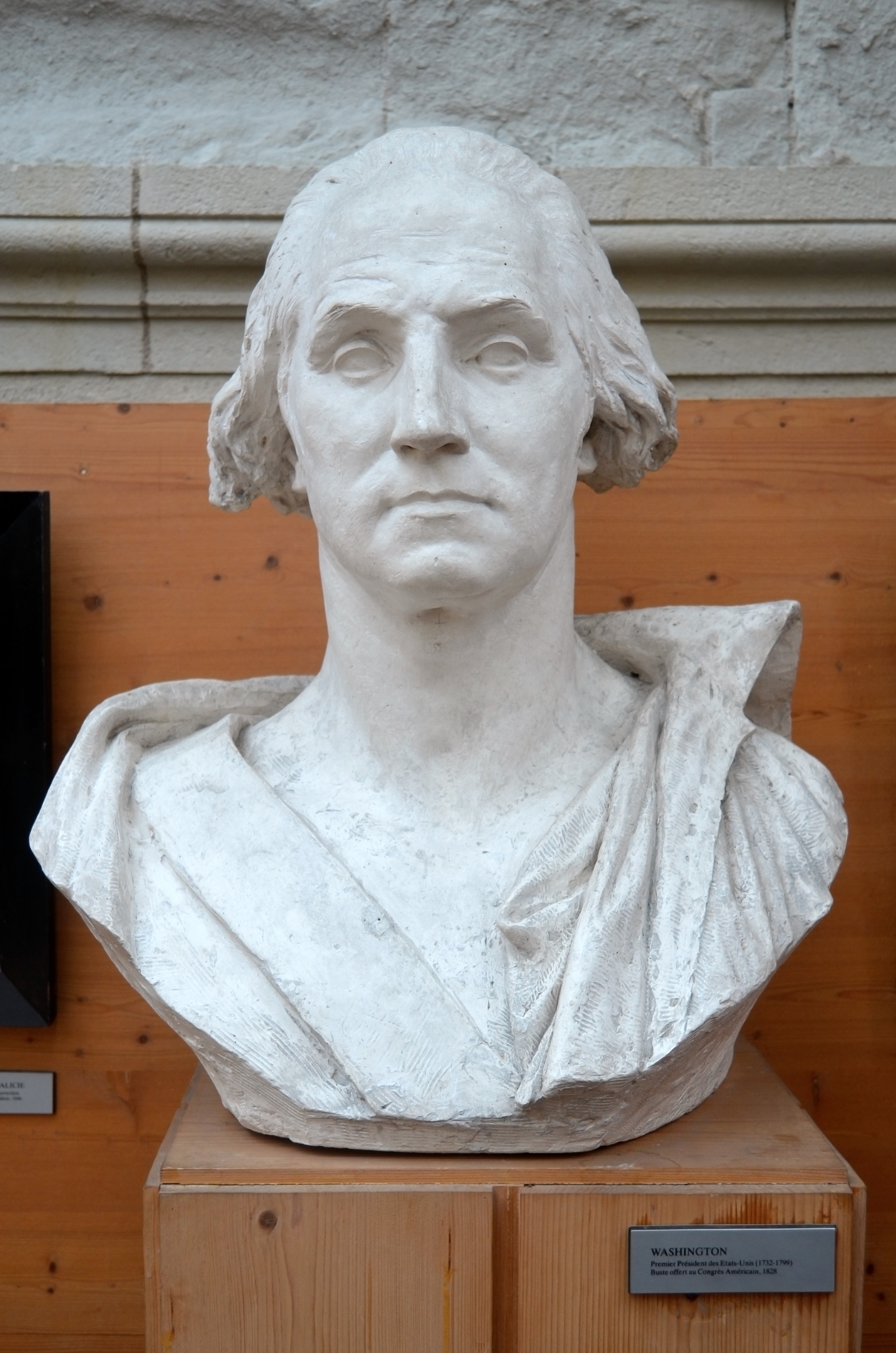
George Washington (1828)

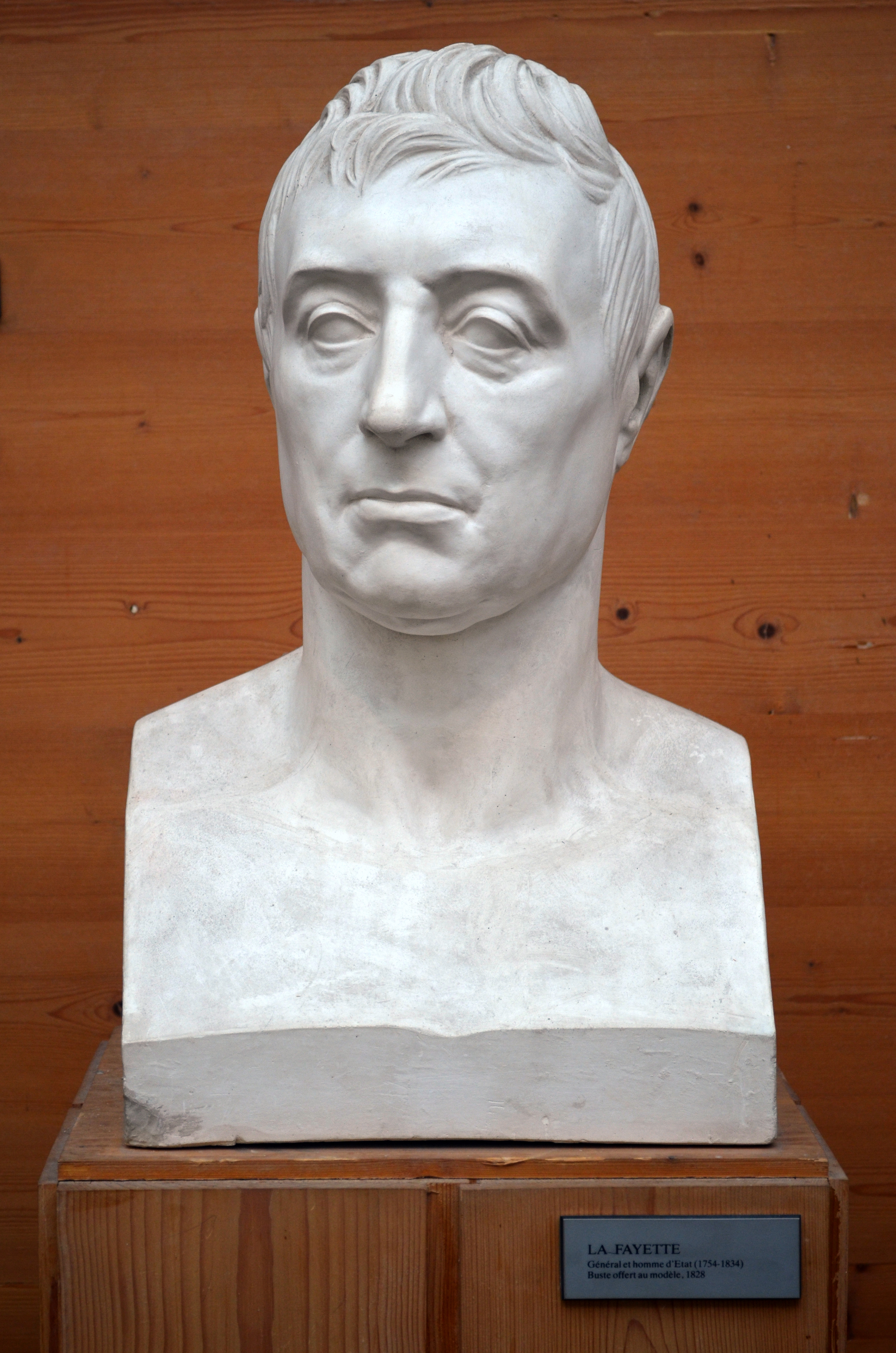
Gilbert du Motier, Marquis de Lafayette (1828)

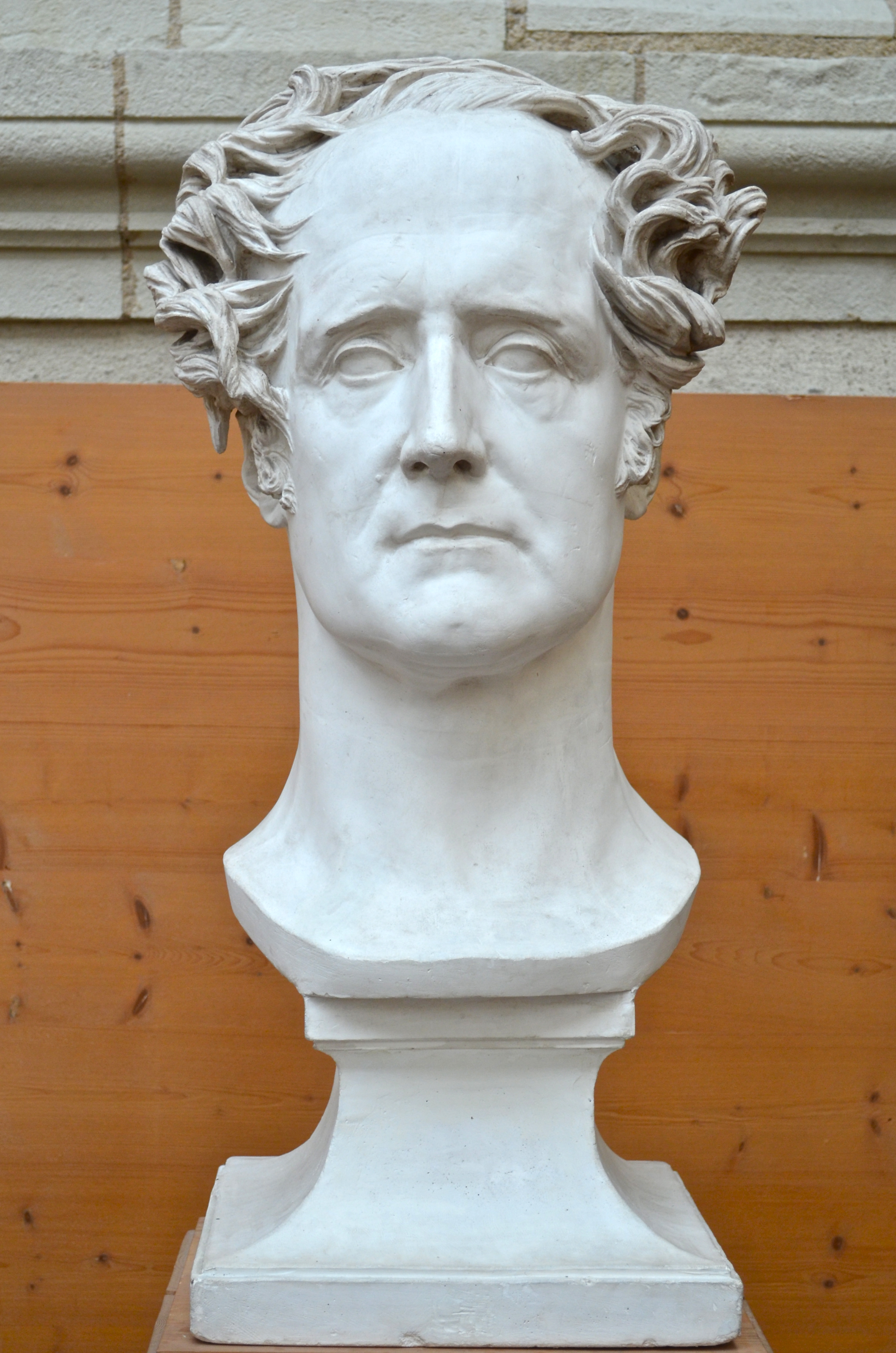
François-René de Chateaubriand (1829)

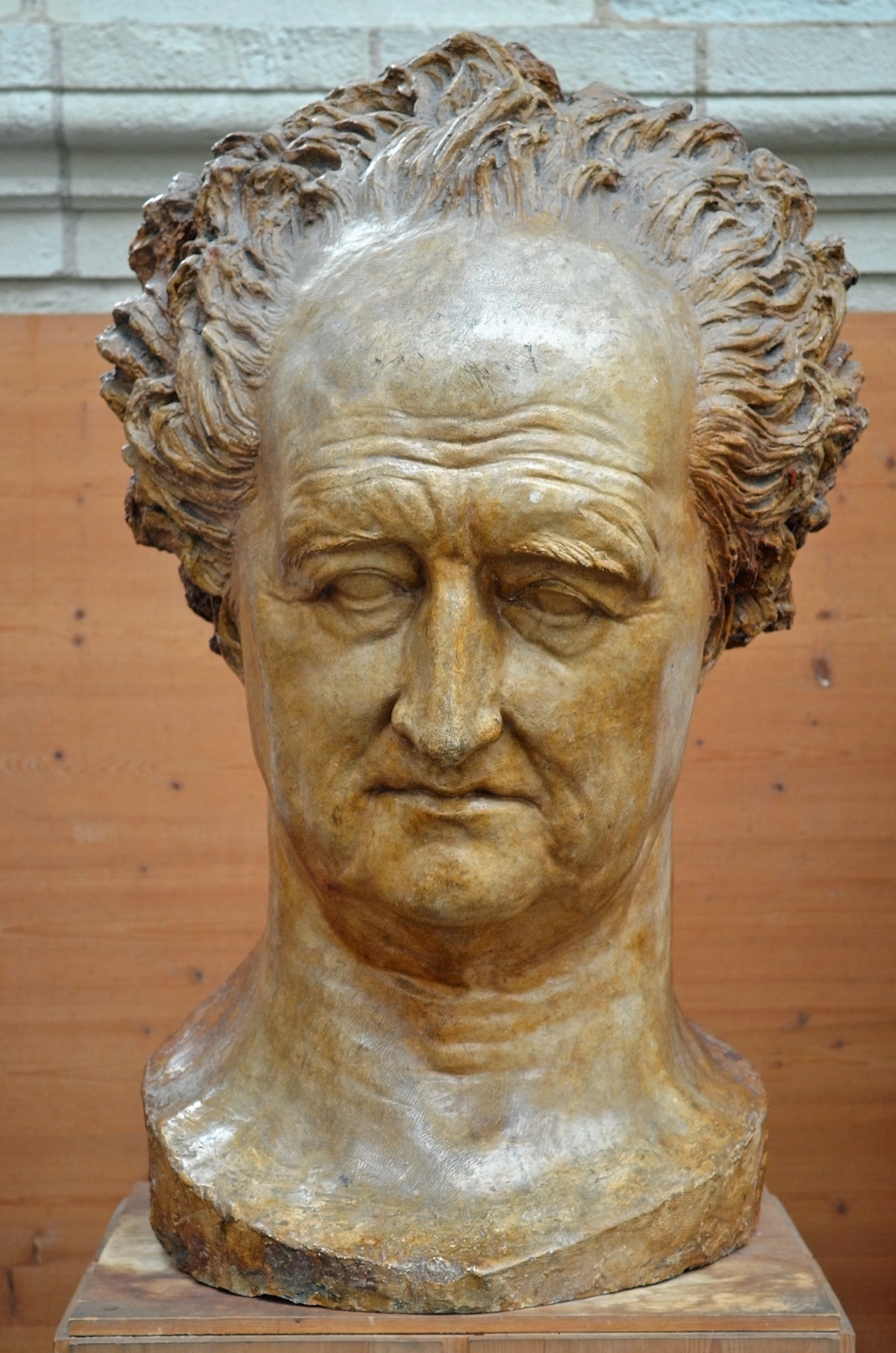
Johann Wolfgang von Goethe (1829)

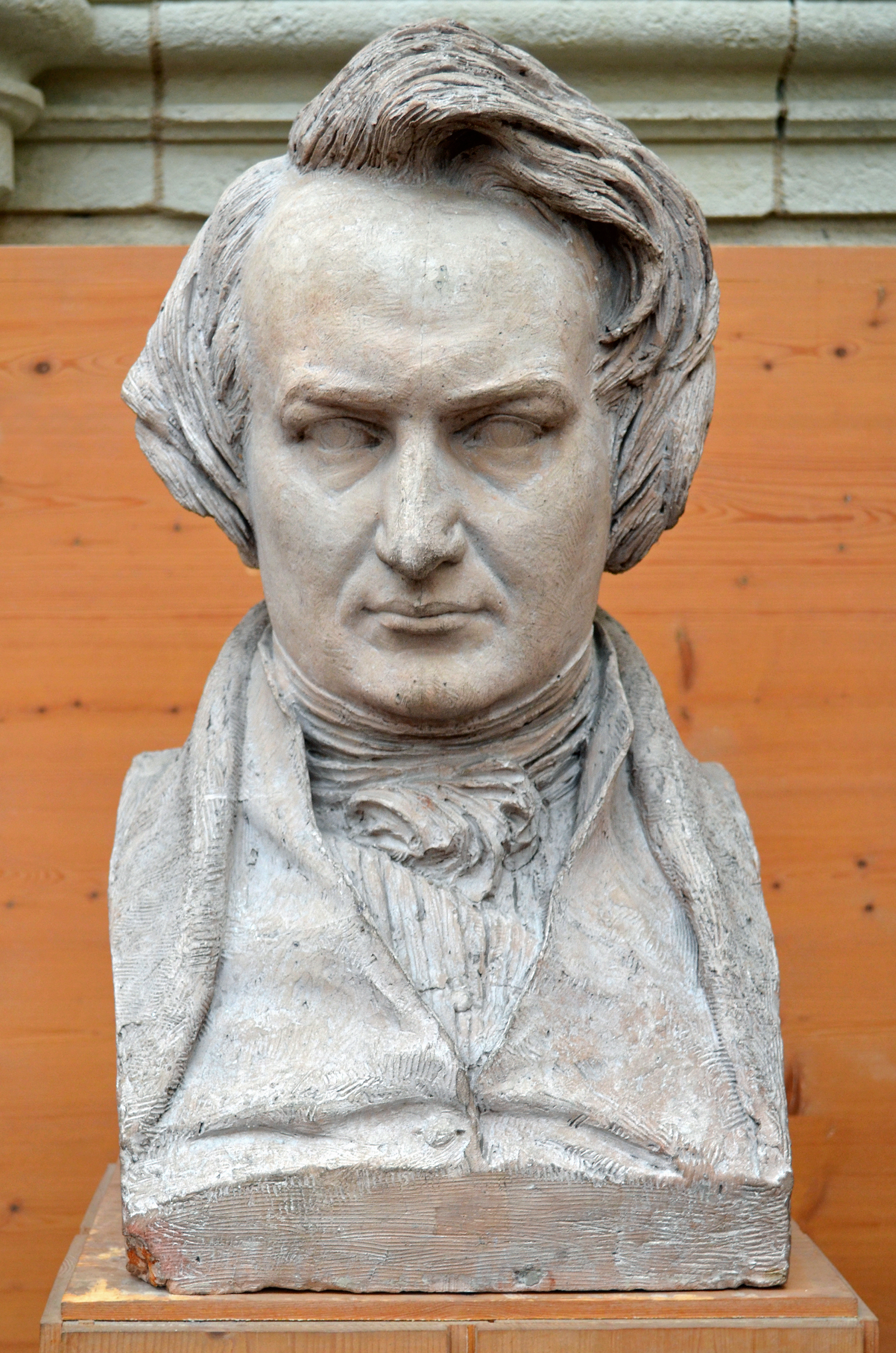
Victor Hugo (1837)

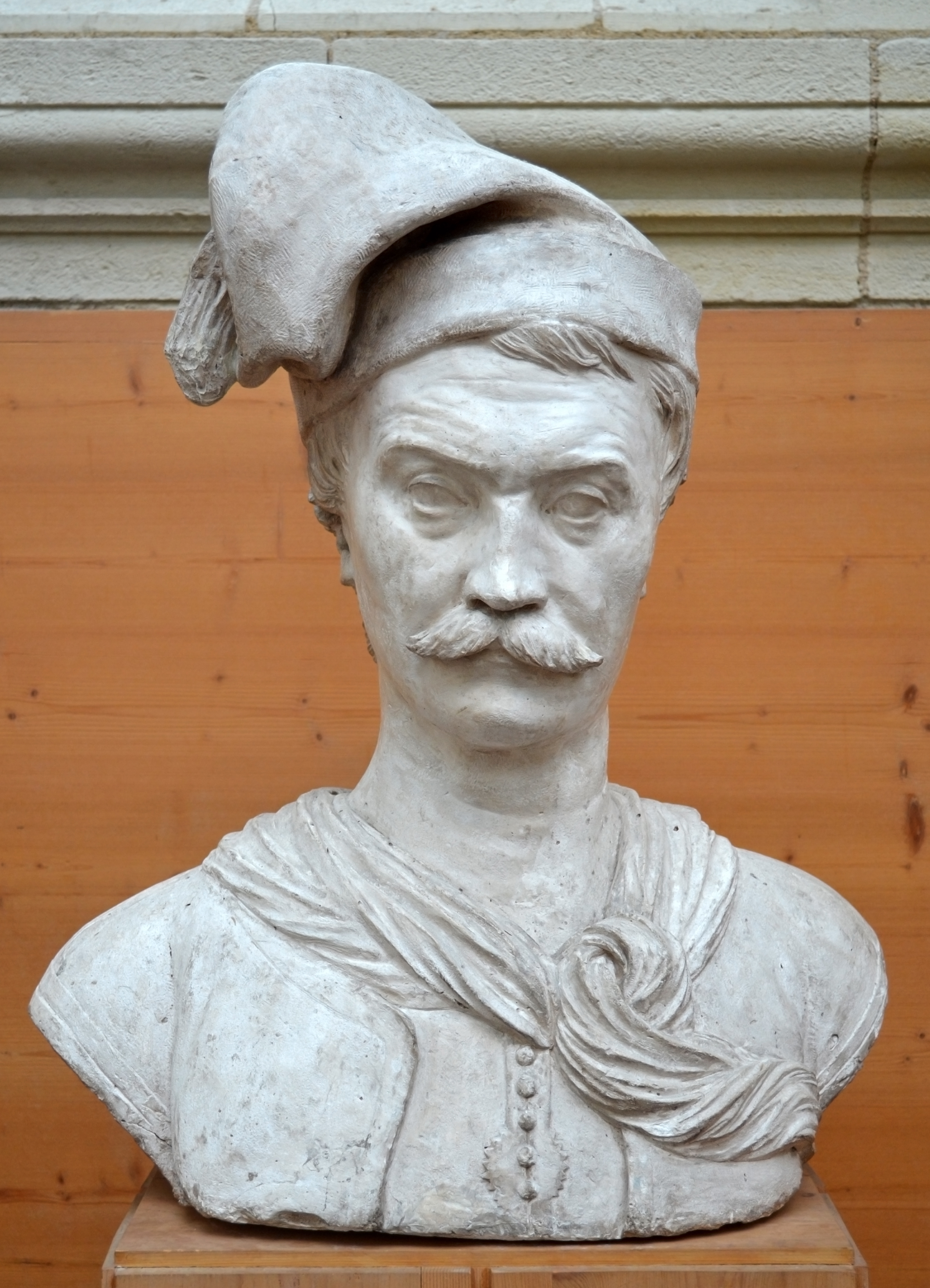
Konstantinos Kanaris (1852)

== See also ==
- Pierre-Jean David d'Angers (French Wikipedia)
