= Back of Beyond =

Back of Beyond may refer to:

== Film ==
- Back of Beyond (film), a 1995 Australian film
- The Back of Beyond, a 1954 Australian documentary
- Back of Beyond, a Caribbean film from Aruba, 2013

== Literature ==
- Back of Beyond, a 2011 novel by C. J. Box
- Back of Beyond, a 1925 novel by Ethel Smith Dorrance
- Back of Beyond, by Lucy Gillen, a Harlequin Romance novels released in 1978
- Back of Beyond, a 1966 children's book by Patricia Lynch
- Back of Beyond, a 1997 children's book by Sarah Ellis
- Back of Beyond, a 1926 novel by Stewart Edward White
- "Back of Beyond", a 1995 short fiction work by Cherry Wilder
- The Back of Beyond: an illustrated companion to Central Asia and Mongolia, by Fitzroy Maclean, 1974
- The Back of Beyond: New Stories, a horror story collection by Alan Ryan

== Music ==
- The Back of Beyond, a 1999 album by Blinddog Smokin'
- The Back of Beyond, a 2007 album by Collarbone
- The Back of Beyond, a 2007 album by Kasmir
- The Back of Beyond, a 2007 album by Nu:Tone
- The Back of Beyond, music for flute and piano, by Ernst Bacon (1898–1990)
- "Back of Beyond", a song by Band of Skulls from the 2016 album By Default

== Other uses ==
- Back of Beyond, a 1946 painting by Ivy Copeland
- The Back of Beyond, a 1996 play by David Ian Rabey
- "The Back of Beyond", a 1951 episode of Somerset Maugham TV Theatre

== See also ==
- Black Stump, an Australian expression for a point beyond which the country is considered remote or uncivilised
- Boondocks, an American expression for a remote rural area
- Back blocks, a New Zealand expression for a remote rural area
- Middle of Nowhere (disambiguation), a similar term for a remote rural area
- Outback, a remote, vast, sparsely populated area of Australia
- Woop Woop, an Australian term meaning a place that is a far distance from anything
