= Average Joe =

Term referring to an average (American) person

The terms average Joe, ordinary Joe, regular Joe, Joe Sixpack, Joe Lunchbucket, Joe Snuffy, Joe Blow, Joe Schmoe (for men), and ordinary Jane, average Jane, and plain Jane (for women), are used primarily in North America and Australia and New Zealand to refer to a completely average person, typically an average American. It can be used both to give the image of a hypothetical "completely average person" or to describe an existing person. Parallel terms in other languages for local equivalents exist worldwide.

Historically, there have been several attempts at answering who exactly is the average American. For example, the Saturday Evening Post and The Washington Post have attempted to answer the question. Both articles agreed that the average American is a white Christian female, who is part of a couple, and is politically independent. Admittedly, there are problems with this answer. In 2001, for example, no single household arrangement constituted more than 30% of total households. Married couples with no children were the most common constituting 28.7% of households. It would nonetheless be inaccurate to state that the average American lives in a childless couple arrangement as 71.3% do not.

Today, statistics by the United States Department of Commerce provide information regarding the societal attributes of those who may be referred to as being "average". While some individual attributes are easily identified as being average, such as the median income, other characteristics, such as family arrangements, may not be identified as being average. In terms of social class, the average American may be described as either being middle class, or working class. As social classes lack distinct boundaries the average American may have a status in the area where the lower middle and upper working class overlap.

"Average Joes" are common fodder for characters in television or movies, comics, novels, or radio dramas. On television, examples of "average Joes" include Doug Heffernan (King of Queens), Alan Harper (Two and a Half Men) and Homer Simpson (The Simpsons). In the film Dodgeball: A True Underdog Story, the protagonist, Peter, owns a gym for those who do not want an intensive workout, and the patrons of the gym are all somewhat overweight. The gym is named Average Joe's Gymnasium. In real life, as chronicled in his bestseller The Average American: The Extraordinary Search for the Nation's Most Ordinary Citizen, Kevin O'Keefe successfully completed a nationwide search for the person who was the most statistically average in the United States during a multi-year span starting in 2000. Newsweek proclaimed of the book, "The journey toward run-of-the-mill has never been so remarkable."

== Families ==
Family arrangements in the US have become more "diverse" with no particular households arrangement being prevalent enough to be identified as the average.

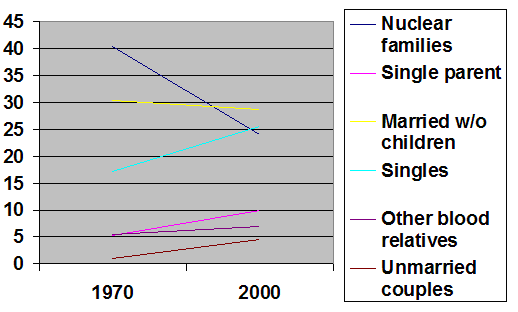
Changes in the composition of US households between 1970 and 2000

As the United States is a highly diverse nation, it should not be surprising that there is no single prevalent household arrangement. While the "nuclear family" consisting of a married couple with their own children is often seen as the average American family, such households constitute less than a quarter of all households. Married couples without children are currently the plurality constituting 28.7% of households, compared to 24.1% for nuclear families.

Another 25.5% of households consisted of single persons residing alone. Recent trends have shown the numbers of nuclear families as well as childless married couples decrease. In 1970, 40.3% of US households consisted of nuclear families with childless couples making up 30.3% of households and 10.6% of households being arranged in "Other family types."

By 2000 the percentage of nuclear families had decreased by 40%, while the number of other family types had increased by 51%. The percentage of single households has also steadily increased. In 1970, only 17% of households consisted of singles. In 2000 that figure had increased by 50% with singles constituting 25.5% of households. The most drastic increase was among the percentage of households made up of single males, which nearly doubled from 5.6% in 1970 to 10.7% in 2000.

Today, one can no longer refer to the nuclear family as the average American household, neither can one identify the current plurality of married couples without children as "the average." Recent statistics indeed indicate that there is no average American family arrangement, but that American society is home to a wide and diverse variety of family arrangements. The one thing the data does indicate is that the average Joe most likely does not reside in a nuclear 4-person family.

The nuclear family ... is the idealized version of what most people think of when they think of "family ..." The old definition of what a family is ... the nuclear family- no longer seems adequate to cover the wide diversity of household arrangements we see today, according to many social scientists (Edwards 1991; Stacey 1996). Thus has arisen the term postmodern family, which is meant to describe the great variability in family forms, including single-parent families and child-free couples.

— Brian K. Williams, Stacey C. Sawyer, Carl M. Wahlstrom, Marriages, Families & Intimate Relationships, 2005.

A statement that can be made, however, is that most Americans will marry at least once in their lifetime with the first marriage most commonly ending in divorce. Today a little over half (52.3%) of US household include a married couple, showing a significant decrease since 1970 when 70.6% of households included a married couple. Current trends indicate that people in the US are marrying later and less often with higher divorce rates.

Despite the declining prevalence of marriage, more than three-quarters of Americans will marry at least once in their lifetime. The average age for marriage for a male was 26.8 and 25.1 for a female. Americans are also likely to remarry after their first divorce. In 1990, 40% of all marriages were remarriages. All together one can conclude that while there is no prevalent average household arrangement, most Americans (the average Joe) will get married and divorced once with a considerable number of Americans remarrying at least once.

Year	Families (69.7%)				Non-families (31.2%)		
Year	Married couples (52.5%)		Single parents	Other blood relatives	Singles (25.5%)		Other non-family
Year	Nuclear family	Without children	Single parents	Other blood relatives	Male	Female	Other non-family
2000	24.1%	28.7%	9.9%	7%	10.7%	14.8%	5.7%
1970	40.3%	30.3%	5.2%	5.5%	5.6%	11.5%	1.7%

== Income ==
Income in the United States is most commonly measured either by individual or household. By only including those above age 25, the vast majority of students and all working adolescents are excluded. The average American, as discussed in the educational attainment section, is a high school graduate who attended but did not graduate from college. From the below table in 2017, the median personal income of such Americans was $37,968, and among those who worked full-time their median personal income was $43,377.

Median personal income by educational attainment, age 25+ (2017)
Measure	Some high school	High school graduate	Some college	Associate's degree	Bachelor's degree or higher	Bachelor's degree	Master's degree	Professional degree	Doctorate degree
Persons, w/ earnings	$24,576	$33,669	$37,968	$37,968	$61,440	$56,592	$70,608	$91,538	$79,231
Male, w/ earnings	$22,214	$32,307	$39,823	$43,785	$70,437	$62,304	$78,222	$111,881	$91,604
Female, w/ earnings	$20,784	$28,896	$33,360	$33,360	$54,480	$49,248	$61,200	$65,012	$68,887
Persons, employed full-time	$30,598	$38,102	$43,377	$47,401	$71,221	$64,074	$77,285	$117,679	$101,307

Ethnic group		All households	Lowest fifth	Second fifth	Middle fifth	Fourth fifth	Highest fifth	Top 5%
White Alone	Numbers in 000s	102,057	18,624	20,056	20,717	21,293	21,367	5,392
White Alone	Percentage	77.79%	70.98%	76.43%	78.95%	81.15%	81.43%	82.17%
Black Alone	Numbers in 000s	17,698	5,490	4,291	3,493	2,592	1,832	350
Black Alone	Percentage	13.49%	20.92%	16.35%	13.31%	9.88%	6.98%	5.33%
Asian Alone	Numbers in 000s	7,276	1,116	0,951	1,235	1,547	2,426	700
Asian Alone	Percentage	5.55%	4.25%	3.62%	4.71%	5.90%	9.25%	10.67%
Hispanic (any race)	Numbers in 000s	19,230	4,333	4,816	4,091	3,572	2,418	492
Hispanic (any race)	Percentage	14.66%	16.51%	18.35%	15.59%	13.61%	9.21%	7.50%

Source: US Census Bureau, 2021

=== Income at a glance ===
Median household income by selected characteristics
Type of household			Race and Hispanic origin				Region			
All households	Family households	Nonfamily households	Asian	Non-Hispanic White	Hispanic (of any race)	Black	Northeast	Midwest	South	West
$70,784	$91,162	$41,797	$101,418	$77,999	$57,981	$48,297	$77,422	$71,129	$63,368	$79,430

Median household income by selected characteristics cont.
Age of Householder		Nativity of Householder		Metropolitan Statistical Area (MSA) Status		Educational Attainment of Householder*			
Under 65 years	65 years and older	Native-born	Foreign-born	Inside MSA	Outside MSA	No HS diploma	HS, no college	Some college	Bachelor min
$80,734	$47,620	$71,522	$66,043	$73,823	$53,750	$30,378	$50,401	$64,378	$115,456
*Householders aged 25 and older. In 2021, the median household income for this group was $72,046.

Median earnings by work status and sex (Persons, aged 15 years and older with earnings)
Total workers			Full-Time, year-round workers		
Both sexes	Male	Female	Both sexes	Male	Female
$45,470	$50,983	$39,201	$56,473	$61,180	$51,226

2020 Median earnings & household income by educational attainment
Measure	Overall	< 9th grade	Some HS	HS grad	Some college	Associate	Bachelor or more	Bachelor	Master	Professional	Doctorate
Persons, age 25+ w/ earnings*	$46,985	$25,162	$26,092	$34,540	$39,362	$42,391	$66,423	$60,705	$71,851	$102,741	$101,526
Male, age 25+ w/ earnings*	$52,298	$30,089	$31,097	$40,852	$47,706	$52,450	$80,192	$71,666	$91,141	$126,584	$121,956
Female, age 25+ w/ earnings*	$40,392	$18,588	$19,504	$27,320	$31,837	$36,298	$57,355	$51,154	$62,522	$92,780	$85,551
Persons, age 25+, employed full-time	$59,371	$33,945	$34,897	$42,417	$50,640	$52,285	$77,105	$71,283	$82,183	$130,466	$119,552
Household	$69,228	$29,609	$29,520	$47,405	$60,392	$68,769	$106,936	$100,128	$114,900	$151,560	$142,493
*Total work experience

Household income distribution
10th percentile	20th percentile	30th percentile	40th percentile	50th percentile	60th percentile	70th percentile	80th percentile	90th percentile	95th percentile
≤ $15,700	≤ $28,000	≤ $40,500	≤ $55,000	$70,800	≤ $89,700	≤ $113,200	≤ $149,100	≤ $212,100	≤ $286,300
Source: US Census Bureau, 2021; income statistics for the year 2021

== Education ==
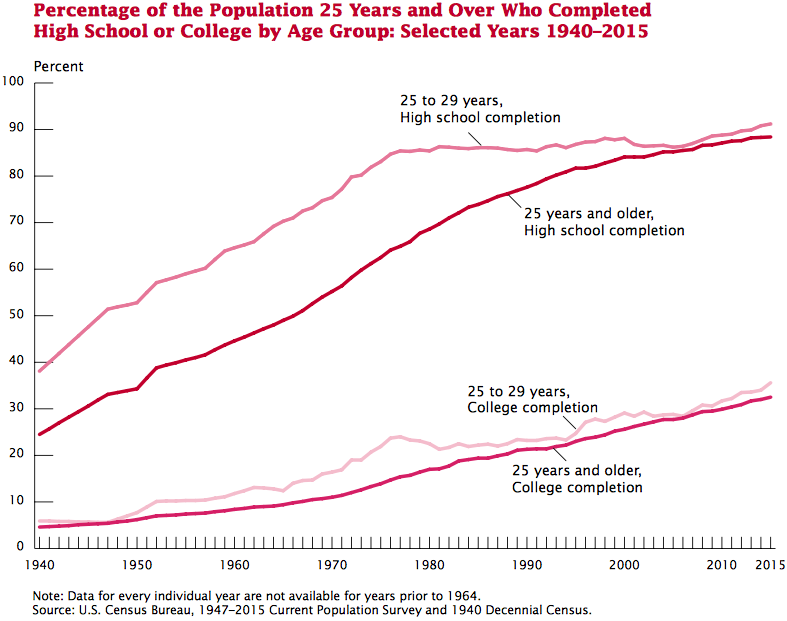
This graph shows the educational attainment since 1940.

The US adult population seems almost equally divided between those who have and those who don't have a college degree, including an Associate degree. While only a minority of Americans, 35%, have graduated from college with a Bachelor's degree or more, a majority, 61%, of Americans had "some college" education. Also, 45% had an associate degree or more, with only roughly 13.7% having a graduate degree. On the other end of the strata, 10% of adults did not graduate from high school.

It is fair to assume that the average Joe/Jane is not a college graduate, but is a high school graduate. However, it is difficult to determine how much college education the average American has, as the population is split between those who graduated, attended but did not graduate, and did not attend college. Over the past half century the educational attainment of the US population has significantly increased. In 2019, the median personal income for American adults age 25+ was $46,985 overall, specifically $52,297 for males and $40,294 for females.

Educational attainment in the United States (2018)
Education	Age 25 and over	Age 25-30
High school diploma or GED	89.80%	92.95%
Some college	61.28%	66.34%
Associate degree	45.16%	46.72%
Bachelor's degree	34.98%	36.98%
Master's degree	13.04%	9.01%
Professional degree	3.47%	2.02%
Doctorate	2.03%	1.12%

Criteria		Overall	Less than 9th grade	Some high school	High school graduate or equivalent	Some college	Associate degree	Bachelor's degree	Bachelor's degree or more	Master's degree	Professional degree	Doctoral degree
Median annual individual income	Male, age 25+	$52,297	$29,405	$32,112	$41,580	$49,676	$53,082	$70,968	$78,156	$89,915	$135,970	$112,305
Median annual individual income	Female, age 25+	$40,294	$20,252	$21,851	$28,166	$32,679	$35,970	$50,691	$56,047	$61,861	$88,301	$87,394
Median annual individual income	Age 25+	$46,985	$25,162	$26,092	$35,540	$39,362	$42,391	$60,705	$66,432	$71,851	$102,741	$101,526
Median annual household income		$70,308	$30,355	$31,326	$48,708	$61,911	$69,573	$100,164	$108,646	$117,439	$162,127	$142,347

== Social class ==
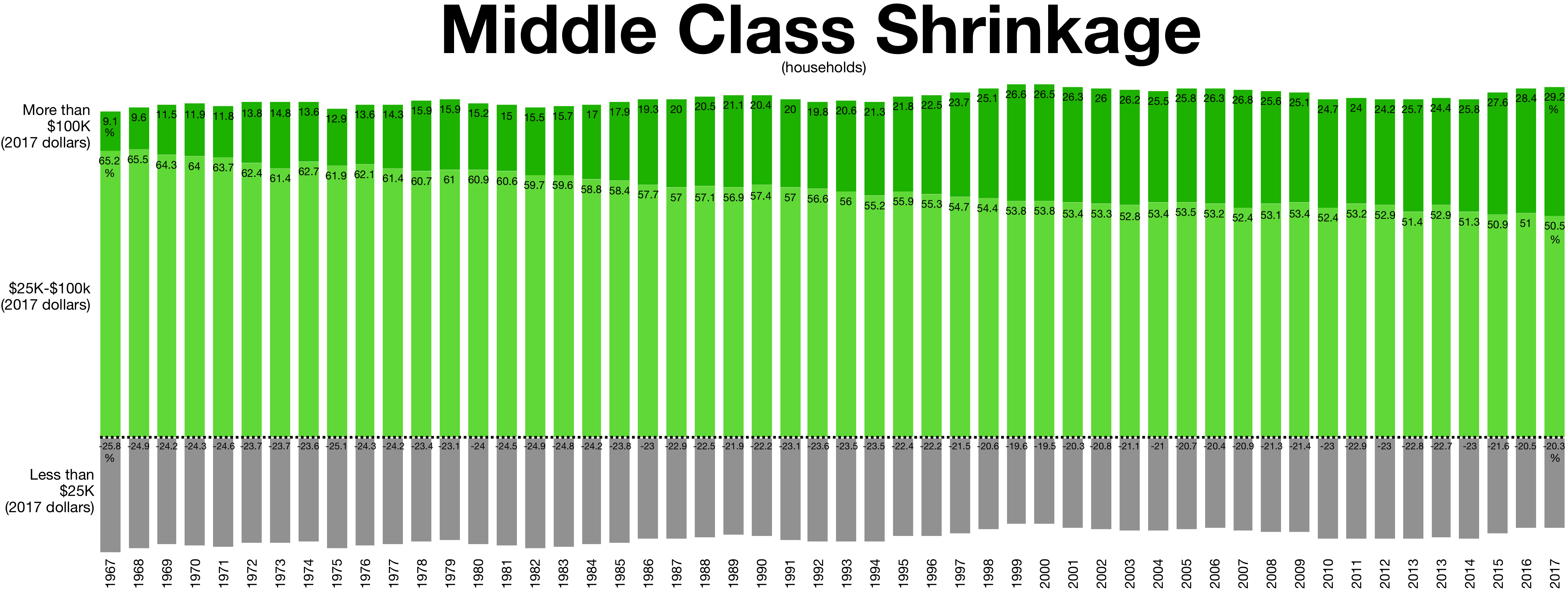
The middle class shrinkage

In terms of social class the average American could be referred to as being both a member of the middle or working class. The discrepancy is largely the result of differing class models and definitions of what constitutes a member of the middle class. Currently the vast majority of Americans self-identify as middle class, yet some experts in the field such as Michael Zweig of Stony Brook University or Dennis Gilbert of Cornell University have brought forth different theories. The majority of American adults are neither professionals nor managers and lack college degrees.

Everyone wants to believe they are middle class. For people on the bottom and the top of the wage scale the phrase connotes a certain Regular Joe cachet. But this eagerness to be part of the group has led the definition to be stretched like a bungee cord.

— Dante Chinni, The Christian Science Monitor

Occupational autonomy is a key factor in regards to class positions. Professionals and managers who are exclusively labeled as middle class, and often as upper middle class, conceptualize, create and consult in their jobs. Due to their great expertise they enjoy a high degree of autonomy in the workplace.

The American economy, however, does not require a labor force consisting solely of professionals. Instead it requires a greatly diverse and specialized labor force. Thus the majority of Americans complete assigned tasks with considerably less autonomy and creative freedom than professionals, leading to theory that they may better be described as being members of the working class.

Academic class models
Dennis Gilbert, 2002		William Thompson & Joseph Hickey, 2005		Leonard Beeghley, 2004	
Class	Typical characteristics	Class	Typical characteristics	Class	Typical characteristics
Capitalist class (1%)	Top-level executives, high-rung politicians, heirs. Ivy League education common.	Upper class (1%)	Top-level executives, celebrities, heirs; income of $500,000+ common. Ivy League education common.	The super-rich (0.9%)	Multi-millionaires whose incomes commonly exceed $3.5 million or more; includes celebrities and powerful executives/politicians. Ivy League education common.
Upper middle class^{[1]} (15%)	Highly-educated (often with graduate degrees), most commonly salaried, professionals and middle management with large work autonomy.	Upper middle class^{[1]} (15%)	Highly-educated (often with graduate degrees) professionals & managers with household incomes varying from the high 5-figure range to commonly above $100,000.	The rich (5%)	Households with net worth of $1 million or more; largely in the form of home equity. Generally have college degrees.
Upper middle class^{[1]} (15%)	Highly-educated (often with graduate degrees), most commonly salaried, professionals and middle management with large work autonomy.	Upper middle class^{[1]} (15%)	Highly-educated (often with graduate degrees) professionals & managers with household incomes varying from the high 5-figure range to commonly above $100,000.	Middle class (plurality/ majority?; ca. 46%)	College-educated workers with considerably higher-than-average incomes and compensation; a man making $57,000 and a woman making $40,000 may be typical.
Lower middle class (30%)	Semi-professionals and craftsmen with a roughly average standard of living. Most have some college education and are white-collar.	Lower middle class (32%)	Semi-professionals and craftsmen with some work autonomy; household incomes commonly range from $35,000 to $75,000. Typically, some college education.	Middle class (plurality/ majority?; ca. 46%)	College-educated workers with considerably higher-than-average incomes and compensation; a man making $57,000 and a woman making $40,000 may be typical.
Working class (30%)	Clerical and most blue-collar workers whose work is highly routinized. Standard of living varies depending on number of income earners, but is commonly just adequate. High school education.	Lower middle class (32%)	Semi-professionals and craftsmen with some work autonomy; household incomes commonly range from $35,000 to $75,000. Typically, some college education.	Middle class (plurality/ majority?; ca. 46%)	College-educated workers with considerably higher-than-average incomes and compensation; a man making $57,000 and a woman making $40,000 may be typical.
Working class (30%)	Clerical and most blue-collar workers whose work is highly routinized. Standard of living varies depending on number of income earners, but is commonly just adequate. High school education.	Working class (32%)	Clerical, pink- and blue-collar workers with often low job security; common household incomes range from $16,000 to $30,000. High school education.	Working class (ca. 40–45%)	Blue-collar workers and those whose jobs are highly routinized with low economic security; a man making $40,000 and a woman making $26,000 may be typical. High school education.
Working poor (13%)	Service, low-rung clerical and some blue-collar workers. High economic insecurity and risk of poverty. Some high school education.	Working class (32%)	Clerical, pink- and blue-collar workers with often low job security; common household incomes range from $16,000 to $30,000. High school education.	Working class (ca. 40–45%)	Blue-collar workers and those whose jobs are highly routinized with low economic security; a man making $40,000 and a woman making $26,000 may be typical. High school education.
Working poor (13%)	Service, low-rung clerical and some blue-collar workers. High economic insecurity and risk of poverty. Some high school education.	Lower class (ca. 14–20%)	Those who occupy poorly-paid positions or rely on government transfers. Some high school education.	Working class (ca. 40–45%)	Blue-collar workers and those whose jobs are highly routinized with low economic security; a man making $40,000 and a woman making $26,000 may be typical. High school education.
Underclass (12%)	Those with limited or no participation in the labor force. Reliant on government transfers. Some high school education.	Lower class (ca. 14–20%)	Those who occupy poorly-paid positions or rely on government transfers. Some high school education.	The poor (ca. 12%)	Those living below the poverty line with limited to no participation in the labor force; a household income of $18,000 may be typical. Some high school education.
References: Gilbert, D. (2002) The American Class Structure: In An Age of Growing Inequality. Belmont, CA: Wadsworth, ISBN 0534541100. Thompson, W. & Hickey, J. (2005). Society in Focus. Boston, MA: Pearson, Allyn & Bacon; Beeghley, L. (2004). The Structure of Social Stratification in the United States. Boston, MA: Pearson, Allyn & Bacon.^{1} The upper middle class may also be referred to as "Professional class" Ehrenreich, B. (1989). The Inner Life of the Middle Class. NY, NY: Harper-Collins.

== Occupation ==
Statistics from the US Bureau of Labor Statistics 2019 Annual Survey
Race	Production, transportation, and material moving	Natural resources, construction, and maintenance	Sales and office	Service	Management, professional, and related
White	11.3	10.1	21.3	15.9	41.4
Black or African American	16.2	5.7	22.3	23.8	31.9
Asian	9.1	3.1	17	15.8	55
Hispanic or Latino	15.4	16.4	20.6	24.2	23.3

The plurality of Americans (41%) today are white-collar salaried employees who work in varied environments, including offices and at home. Roughly 25% of Americans were employed in the traditional blue-collar fields that involve physical labor. And 34% of Americans are employed in the service industry, including about one-third in the healthcare industry (11% of the total).

Educational attainment varied greatly depending on occupational field with 68% of those in the professional and professional support fields having a bachelor's degree or higher, compared to only 31.6% of those employed in sales and 11.6% of those in the service sector. The average American does not have a bachelor's degree, and is most likely employed in the tertiary sector of the economy, encompassing both non-professional white-collar and pink-collar work. Altogether the American economy and labor force have changed greatly since the middle of the 20th century, with most workers today no longer being employed in blue-collar occupations.

== Homeownership ==
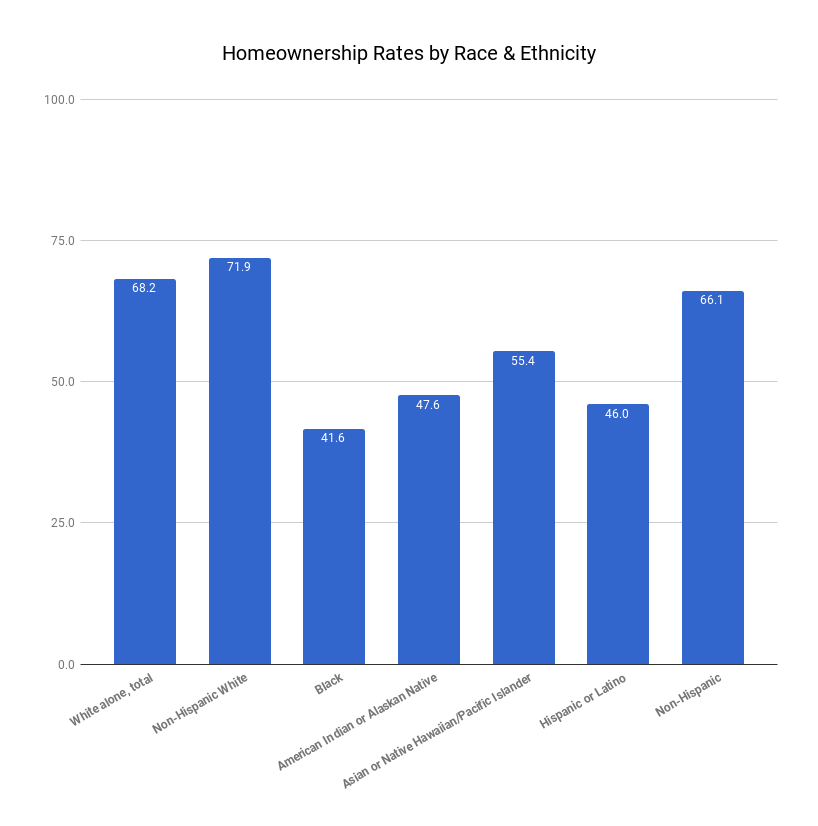
Homeownership rate according to race & ethnicity in 2016

The majority of American households are "homeowners" but likely owe on a mortgage, as the term also includes households that owe on a mortgage. According to ATTOM Data Research, only "34 percent of all American homeowners have 100 percent equity in their properties – they've either paid off their entire mortgage debt or they never had a mortgage".

Homeownership is the primary asset most Americans use to generate wealth. For majority of U.S. homeowners, their home equity represents 50-70% of their net wealth. In first quarter 2023, the average American with an active mortgage had a home equity close to US$275,000.

According to US Department of Commerce data in 2005, 67% of housing units in the United States were owner occupied, had three or fewer bedrooms with one or less occupant per room (including kitchen, dining room, living room, etc.) and were mortgaged. The overwhelming majority, 85%, of all housing units had three or fewer bedrooms. The plurality of housing units, 40%, had three bedrooms. The majority, 67%, of housing units were mortgaged with 52% of households spending 25% or less of their annual income on mortgage payments.

The median value of a housing unit in the US was $167,500 in 2005 with the median mortgage payment being $1,295. The average size of a household was 2.5 persons with almost all housing units, 97%, having 1 or fewer occupants per room. However, the term "room" does not exclusively refer to bedrooms, but includes the kitchen, dining room, family room, bathrooms and any other rooms a house might have. While 85% of American homes had 3 or fewer bedrooms, the median number of total rooms per housing units was 5.3 in 2005. These statistics suggest that the average Americans reside in their own home, and pay roughly $1,000 per month in mortgage payments for a three or fewer bedroom house with no more than one occupant per room.

US Census Bureau data from 2002 identified housing characteristics for owner-occupied units inhabited by households with average incomes, ranging from $40,000 to $60,000. The median square footage for homes occupied by middle-income households was 1,700 with 52% of such homes having two or more bathrooms. The median value of these homes was $112,000 with the median year of construction being 1970. Middle-income households tended to spend roughly 18% of their monthly income on housing. Thus it is likely that many average Americans reside in 1,700-square-foot (160 m^{2}) homes, priced slightly above $100,000 with two or more bathrooms that were built in the late 1960s and early 1970s. However, the taken income is slightly above average.

== See also ==
- Alan Smithee
- Commoner
- Culture of the United States
- Demographics of the United States
- Joe Shmoe
- Joe's Diner (placeholder name)
- John Doe
- John Q. Public
- Homeownership in the United States
- Keeping up with the Joneses
- List of terms related to an average person
- Social structure of the United States

International

- Aam Aadmi (India)
- Jan Kowalski (Poland)
- Joe Bloggs and man on the Clapham Omnibus (United Kingdom)
- Man on the Bondi tram (Australia)
- Ola Nordmann and Peder Ås (Norway)
- Otto Normalverbraucher, German Average Joe
- Medelsvensson (Sweden)
