= List of placeholder names =

This is a list of placeholder names (words that can refer to things, persons, places, numbers and other concepts whose names are temporarily forgotten, irrelevant, unknown or being deliberately withheld in the context in which they are being discussed) in various languages.

== Arabic ==
Arabic uses Fulan and Fulana[h] (فلان / فلانة, translated as "someone") as placeholder for first names. When a last name is needed, Fulan is repeated, e.g. Fulan AlFulani and Fulana[h] AlFulaniyya[h] (فلان الفلاني / فلانة الفلانية). The use of Fulan has been borrowed into Spanish, Portuguese, Persian, Turkish and Malay. Moroccan Arabic uses "hadak" and "hadik", the masculine and feminine versions of "this", often followed by man, woman, place, or thing.

X ben X (lit. 'X, son of X', Arabic: إكس بن إكس or سين بن سين) is used in Morocco by health and judicial authorities in cases where an individual's identity cannot be determined. These cases include amnesiacs, suspects, hospital patients, and homeless people. In 2009, 80,000 abandoned orphans had the placeholder name of X ben X and 100 unidentified bodies are buried each year in Morocco under this status.

== Argentina ==
- María Victoria Villareal, Manuela Martínez, and Manuela Fernández have been used in National Identity Cards (DNI) specimens.
- Virgilio Portillo is a non-citizen, typically a Paraguayan.
- Juan Pérez is used colloquially as a generic male full name.
- Fulano, Mengano, Zutano, three fake names, were used in the past as 'some guy,' as in "On his way to work he ran into Fulano [some guy] and they spoke for a while."

== Assyrian Neo-Aramaic ==
Inna ܐܸܢܵܐ or hinna ܗܸܢܵܐ are used for "thingy", "thingamabob", etc. "Ayka dre-li inna?" roughly translates to "Where did I put the thingamabob?" A verb of the root '-N-L (ܐܢܠ) likely derived from the noun is used to express actions similarly; for verbs that don't immediately come to mind. Though not directly translatable into English, e.g. "Si m'annil-leh" roughly translates to "go do that thing". Similarly to other Semitic languages, plān ܦܠܵܢ (masculine) and plānīthā ܦܠܵܢܝܼܬ݂ܵܐ (feminine) are used for "so-and-so".

== Australia ==
In Australia, the term Man on the Clapham omnibus inspired the New South Wales and Victorian equivalents, "the man on the Bondi tram" (a now disused tram route in Sydney), "the man on the Bourke Street tram" (Melbourne), and "the ordinary person on the Belconnen omnibus" (Canberra).

== Austria ==
- Hans Meier / Maier / Mayer
- Herr und Frau Österreicher (Mr and Mrs Austrian)

== Belgium (Dutch) ==
- Jan met de pet ("John with the cap")

== Bengali ==
Bengali uses the universal placeholder ইয়ে iẏē. It is generally placed for a noun which cannot be recalled by the speaker at the time of speech. ইয়ে iẏē can be used for nouns, adjectives, and verbs (in conjunction with light verbs). অমুক amuk can also be a placeholder for people or objects. ফলনা/ফলানা falanā/falānā and its female equivalent ফলনি falani is a placeholder specific to people.

== Bulgaria ==
- "Сульо и пульо" (sulyo i pulyo, Poor and Blind), used for "anyone and everyone", albeit in a more insulting sense, implying that the person/people you're talking about are lowly, ignorant, of little means, or otherwise unqualified.
  - Another term with a similar connotation to the one above is "куцо и сакато" (kutso i sakato, Limp and Lame).
- Another term for "anyone and everyone" is "Иван, Драган и Петкан" (Ivan, Dragan and Petkan) or just "Драган и Петкан" (Dragan and Petkan), this time using names. Ivan is the most common name in Bulgarian, while Dragan and Petkan are chosen due to them rhyming with the name Ivan. This term is more generally applicable to "everyone" or "the average person" due to its relative lack of a negative connotation.
- "Филанкишия(та)" (Filankishiya(ta), the unknown one), a term that could mean "anyone" but more directly means "someone non-existent". Both the indefinite form, филанкишия, and the definite form, филанкишията, are used.

Note: All of the terms listed for Bulgarian are strictly colloquialisms and hold no formal or official status.

== Chinese ==
In Chinese, the placeholder names are usually 张三 (Zhāng Sān) and 李四 (Lǐ Sì), from two of the most common surnames in China and the numbers three and four. They come from Wang Anshi's 拟寒山拾得 (lit. 'In the style of Hanshan and Shide'). They do not have strong gender connotations. They are sometimes extended to other surname-number pairings; examples include 劉一 (Líu Yī), 陳二 (Chén Èr), 張三 (Zhāng Sān), 李四 (Lǐ Sì), 王五 (Wáng Wǔ), 趙六 (Zhào Lìu), 孫七 (Sūn Qī), 周八 (Zhōu Bā), 吳九 (Wǔ Jiǔ), and 鄭十 (Zhèng Shí), following the scheme of a common surname followed by a number.

小明 (Xiǎo Míng) (Jyutping: siu^{2} ming^{4}, Wugniu: ^{3}siau-min_{2}) is also a common generic placeholder name in Chinese, particularly in educational or comedic situations. In Taiwan, it can refer to people from mainland China.

- 某某 (pinyin: Mǒumǒu, Jyutping: mau^{5} mau^{5}, Wugniu: ^{4}meu-meu_{4}), 某甲 (pinyin: Mǒujiǎ, Jyutping: mau^{5} gaap^{3}, Wugniu: ^{4}meu-ciaq_{7}), 某乙 (pinyin: Mǒuyǐ, Jyutping: mau^{5} jyut^{3}, Wugniu: ^{4}meu-iq_{7}), etc., equivalent to "Person A, Person B, etc."; 某 meaning "a certain". Heavenly stems are often used to number the unspecified people.

=== Mainland China ===
- 冬冬 (Dōngdōng), 妞妞 (Niǔniǔ), 妮妮 (Níní) for children

=== Hong Kong ===
- 陳大文 (Jyutping: can^{4} daai^{6} man^{4}) (male) and 陳小美 (Jyutping: can^{4} siu^{2} mei^{5}) (female)
- 樂永晴 (Jyutping: lok^{6} wing^{5} cing^{4}) or Lok Wing Ching, the name currently used on the sample identity card.
- In Hong Kong, there is an expression equivalent to "Man on the Clapham omnibus": "the man on the Shau Kei Wan tram".

=== Taiwan ===
- 志明 (pinyin: Zhìmíng, POJ: Chì-bêng) (male) and 春嬌 (pinyin: Chūnjiāo, POJ: Chhun-kiau) (female)

== Colombia ==
- Pepito or Pepita Pérez (lit. "Little Joe Pérez" or "Little Josephine Pérez"), used due to its alliterative sound.

== Croatia ==
- Ivan Horvat, Ivo Ivić, Pero Perić

== Czechia ==
- Jan Novák ("John/Jon Newman"), Jana Nováková ("Jane Newman"); the most common Czech name and surname
- Otakar Všudybyl ("Ottokar Waseverywhere") and Jana Zcestovalá ("Jane Welltraveled"), used on travelcards or ID cards samples
- BFU (Běžný Franta Uživatel, "Basic User Frank"), meaning "brain free user"

== Danish ==
=== People ===
A variety of names can be used as placeholders in common parlance in Danish. The Danish use "Hr. & Fru Danmark" or Mr. & Mrs. Denmark to describe a generic couple of "average Joe".

In civil law, letters of the alphabet (A, B, C etc.) are used as placeholders for names. In criminal law, T is used for the accused (tiltalte), V is a non-law enforcement witness (vidne), B is a police officer (betjent) and F or FOU is the victim (forurettede). When there is more than one person in a role, a number is added, e.g. V1, V2 and B1, B2.

=== Places ===
Faraway countries are often called Langtbortistan. Langtbortistan was first used in 1959 in the weekly periodical Anders And & Co. as Sonja Rindom's translation of Remotistan. Since 2001, it has been included in Retskrivningsordbogen.

Backwards places in the countryside are called Lars Tyndskids marker, lit. The fields of Lars Diarrhea. Similarly Hvor kragerne vender, lit. Where the crows turn around may also be used for denoting both a far away and backward place at the same time.

The expression langt pokker i vold is a placeholder for a place far far away e.g. he kicked the ball langt pokker i vold.

- Hr. og Fru Hakkebøf (Mr. and Mrs. Beef Patty)

== Egyptian ==
In Ancient Egypt, the names Hudjefa and Sedjes, literally meaning "erased" and "missing", were used by later Egyptian scribes in kings lists to refer to much older previous pharaohs whose names had by that time been lost.

== Estonia ==
- Inimene tänavalt (Person from the street)

== Finland ==
- Matti Meikäläinen (male) Maija Meikäläinen (female).

== French ==
Jean Dupont is the equivalent of John Doe.

"Schmilblick" is the placeholder for an object in France, derived from a 1960s radio show. French also uses trucmuche which translates as "thingy".

- Usable as a common word: Pierre-Paul-Jacques (with the meaning of "Someone");
- Random people (similar to Average John/Jane): Monsieur/Madame Tout-le-monde (Mr/Mrs Everyone), Untel/Unetelle (Mr/Mrs NoName; literally, "a such" and thus similar to the English "so-and-so"), Madame Michu (only female), (M./Mme) Tartempion (familiar and a little satirical);
- Other:
  - (M./Mme) Machin/Machine (familiar terms, used when one does not wish take the trouble to think of a more specific term);
  - (Un) Gazier originally, a man who worked in gas transport; nowadays, it is a familiar way to say "Someone" (mostly for a man; this term is rare for women, and in such case, the correct word is the feminine form "Gazière").
  - (Un) Quidam: someone whose identity is unknown or cannot be disclosed.

See also fr:wikt:Tartempion#Synonymes

== Galician ==
Research in Galician language (and Spanish and Portuguese) has classified the toponymic placeholders for faraway locations into four groups:

- related to blasphemies and bad words (no carallo, na cona)
- related to religious topics (onde Cristo deu as tres voces, onde San Pedro perdeu as chaves, onde a Virxe perdeu as zapatillas)
- local (Galician) real toponyms (majorly en Cuspedriños, but also en Coirós or en Petelos)
- international toponyms (na China, na Co(n)chinchina, en Tombuctú, en Fernando Poo, en Bosnia)

There is also a humoristic, infrequent element, as in en Castrocú. Some can add more than one element (na cona da Virxe). The prevalence of the adjective quinto ("fifth") is also notable.

== German ==
=== Things ===
German also sports a variety of placeholders; some, as in English, contain the element Dings, Dingens (also Dingenskirchen for towns), Dingsda, Dingsbums, cognate with English thing.

A generic (and/or inferior) technical device (as opposed to e.g. a brand item) is often called a 08/15 (after the WWI-era MG 08 machine gun, whose extensive mass production gave it its "generic" character) pronounced in individual numbers null-acht-fünfzehn.

=== Persons ===
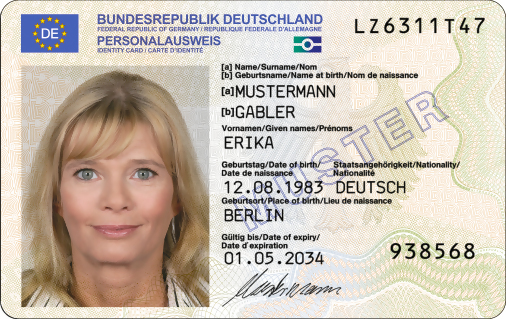
German identity card of Erika Mustermann (2024)

The German equivalent to the English John Doe for males and Jane Doe for females would be Max Mustermann (Max Exampleperson) and Erika Mustermann, respectively; the Mustermann names have been used in this role since 1978. For many years, Erika Mustermann has been used on the sample picture of German identity cards (Personalausweis). More recently, other first names have been used in specific contexts, including Leon Mustermann for a sample children's passport, Cleopâtre Mustermann for a sample travel document for foreigners, and Manu Musterperson as a gender-neutral form. There is also Krethi und Plethi, Hinz und Kunz, or Hans und Franz for everybody similar to the English Tom, Dick and Harry. Otto Normalverbraucher (Otto Normal Consumer) is used for economics-related purposes.

== Hawaiian Pidgin ==
Hawaiian Pidgin uses the phrase "da kine" as a placeholder for unspecified people, places and things.

== Hebrew ==
In Hebrew, the word זה (zeh, meaning 'this') is a placeholder for any noun. The term צ׳ופצ׳יק (chúpchik, meaning a protuberance, particularly the diacritical mark geresh), a borrowing of Russian чубчик (chúbchik, a diminutive of чуб chub "forelock") may refer to any small object or a small part of an object and may be translated as "thingie".

In ID and credit card samples, the usual name is ישראל ישראלי (Yisrael Yisraeli) for a man and ישראלה ישראלי (Yisraela Yisraeli) for a woman (these are actual first and last names) – similar to John and Jane Doe. The Hebrew word for anonymous, Almoni, is used as Ploni Almoni and Plonit Almonit, also similar to John and Jane Doe.

The traditional terms are פלוני (ploni) and its counterpart אלמוני (almoni) (originally mentioned in Ruth 4:1). The combined term פלוני אלמוני (ploni almoni) is also in modern official usage; for example, addressing guidelines by Israel postal authorities use ploni almoni as the addressee.

A placeholder for a time in the far past is תרפפ״ו (tarapapu), which resembles a year number in the Hebrew calendar. Years of the Hebrew calendar are commonly written in Hebrew numerals. For example, the year Anno Mundi 5726 would be written as ה׳תשכ״ו, which can be further abbreviated to תשכ״ו by omitting the first letter that stands for thousands. What makes תרפפ״ו unusual is the use of the same letter פ׳ twice. The word תרפפ״ו has the gematria of 766 = 400 (ת) + 200 (ר) + 80 (פ) + 80 (פ) + 6 (ו), but as a numeral, it would usually be written with the shorter sequence 400 (ת) + 300 (ש) + 60 (ס) + 6 (ו).

== Hong Kong ==
=== Public examination ===
In the Hong Kong Diploma of Secondary Education and its predecessor public examinations, candidates are instructed to use the name "Chris Wong" as a placeholder name in English Language papers. This maintains anonymity when no other name is provided in the prompts. Failure to follow this instruction may result in penalties, as stated in the official guideline provided by the Hong Kong Examinations and Assessment Authority.

== Icelandic ==
=== Persons ===
In Icelandic, the most common placeholder names are Jón Jónsson for men and Jóna Jónsdóttir for women. The common or average Icelander is referred to as meðaljón (lit. average John).

=== Time ===
An unspecified or forgotten date from long time ago is often referred to as sautján hundruð og súrkál (seventeen hundred and sauerkraut).

== India ==
- Aam Aadmi - lit. "ordinary person" in Hindi
- Ashok Kumar has been used in multiple court cases as a placeholder name as well

== Pakistan ==
In Pakistan, mainly where the languages are more influenced by Persian, they use Falana as a placeholder more commonly for anonymous person.

== Indonesian ==
=== Universal ===
Anu can be used colloquialy as a placeholder for an object, person, action, concept, or anything whose name is unknown or forgotten. For example, si Anu membeli anu di toko anu (Anu buys anu in an anu shop).

=== Persons ===
There is no single name that is widely accepted, but Joni (Johnny) and Budi are widely used for males in elementary textbooks. Ini ibu Budi (this is Budi's mother) was a common phrase in primary school's standardized reading textbook from 1980s until it was removed in 2014. Popular female placeholder names are Ani, Sinta, Sri, and Dewi.

Fulan (male) and Fulanah (female) are also often found, especially in religious articles. Both are derived from Arabic. These two also have other variations derived from them such as localized Polan and Polanah.

=== Time ===
Zaman kuda gigit besi (the era when horses bite iron) means the time when horses biting iron (or bridle) are still very common on roads. There is also zaman baheula which indicates a very long time ago. Baheula is a Sundanese loan word meaning ancient.

== Irish ==
=== Things ===
Common Irish placeholders for objects include an rud úd "that thing over there", an rud sin eile "that other thing", and cá hainm seo atá air "whatever its name is".

=== Persons ===
In Irish, the common male name "Tadhg" is part of the very old phrase Tadhg an mhargaidh (Tadhg of the market-place), which combines features of the English phrases "average Joe" and "man on the street".

This same placeholder name, transferred to English-language usage and now usually rendered as Taig, became and remains a vitriolic derogatory term for an Irish Catholic and has been used by Unionists in Northern Ireland in such bloodthirsty slogans as "If guns are made for shooting, then skulls are made to crack. You've never seen a better Taig than with a bullet in his back" and "Don't be vague, kill a Taig".

Irish English speakers will often refer to a person whose name is unknown (or can't be recalled) as "your man".

== Italian ==
=== Persons ===
The names 'Tizio, Caio e Sempronio' are the classic Italian placeholder names used similarly to the English "Tom, Dick and Harry". The phrase has long been used in Italian to describe a generic set of people. It originated in Bologna during the Middle Ages, where a jurist, Irnerio, wrote of 'Titius et Gaius et Sempronius', originally Latin names which morphed into the Italian.

- Mario Rossi, a very common name
- Pinco Pallino, a made up name
- Tal dei Tali, a made up name with the meaning of "so-and-so of all the so-and-sos", i.e., a particular so-and-so)
- Signor Nessuno ("Mr. Nobody")

The names have also been linked to Tiberius, Gaius and Sempronius Gracchus.

== Japanese ==
名無しの権兵衛 Nanashi no Gonbei (lit. Nameless Gonbei) is a common placeholder name for a person whose name is unknown, comparable to John Doe in English. Gonbei is an old masculine given name that, due to being common in the countryside, came to have connotations of "hillbilly".

On documents or forms requiring a first and last name, 山田 太郎 Yamada Tarō and 山田 花子 Yamada Hanako are very commonly used example names for men and women respectively, comparable to John and Jane Smith in English. Both are generic but possible names in Japanese. Yamada, whose characters mean 'mountain' and 'rice field' respectively, is not the most common last name in Japan, ranking 12th nationwide in 2024; however, it is a mundane name that appears throughout the country. Tarō used to be a common name to give to firstborn sons; though it has declined in popularity, it is still sometimes given to boys. Hanako (literally "flower child") was once a common name for girls but is considered old-fashioned nowadays.

Sometimes, Yamada will be replaced with the name of a company, place, or a related word; for example, 東芝 太郎 Tōshiba Tarō for Toshiba, 駒場 太郎 Komaba Tarō for Tokyo University (one of its three main campuses is located in Komaba), or 納税 太郎 Nōzei Tarō on tax return forms (nōzei means "to pay taxes"; it is not a last name). Although Tarō and Hanako are by far the most popular due to their recognizability as example names, different first names, such as 一郎 Ichirō or 夏子 Natsuko for men and women respectively, may be used. In recent years, there have also been more unique placeholder names, such as 奈良 鹿男 Nara Shikao for the city of Nara (shika means "deer", which is a symbol of the city) and 有鳶 時音 Arutobi Jion for the company アルトビジョン Altovision.

When avoiding specifying a person, place or thing, 某 bō can be used as a modifier to a noun to mean 'unnamed' or 'certain/particular' (e.g. 某政治家 bō seijika, "a certain politician"). When referring to multiple people or when keeping people anonymous, it is also common to use A, B, C, etc., with or without honorifics. 子 ko may be added to the end for girls and women (e.g. A子 ēko).

The symbols 〇〇/○○, read まるまる marumaru (doubling of 丸 maru meaning 'circle') is a common placeholder when various values are possible in its place or to censor information, similar to underscores, asterisks, <blank> or [redacted] in English. It can be used in place of any noun or adjective. The symbols ××, read チョメチョメ chomechome, ペケペケ pekepeke or バツバツ batsubatsu are also used, although chomechome is sometimes avoided due to having sexual connotations. The symbols are usually doubled but can be repeated more times. Placeholder symbols are sometimes read ほにゃらら honyarara.

Other filler words include 何とか nantoka, 何たら nantara and 何何 naninani. These can be used for a person whose name has been temporarily forgotten (e.g. なんとかちゃん nantoka-chan, roughly "Miss What's-her-name" in the third person). 何とか nantoka and 何とやら nantoyara are sometimes used when purposefully omitting a word from a saying (e.g. 何とかも木から落ちる nantoka mo ki kara ochiru instead of 猿も木から落ちる saru mo ki kara ochiru, meaning "even monkeys fall from trees"; the word 猿 saru meaning "monkey" has been replaced with 何とか nantoka meaning "something" or "you-know-what", although "monkey" is still implied).

誰々 daredare or 誰某 daresore for people, 何処何処 dokodoko or 何処其処 dokosoko for places and 何れ何れ doredore or 何其 doresore for things that are unnamed or forgotten are also used.

In computing, starting in the late 1980s, hoge (ほげ, no literal meaning) or hogehoge (doubled) were used much like foo and bar, although their use seems to have decreased in recent years.

== Korean ==

Hong Gildong, the name of a famous outlaw, has become a placeholder name in Korea.

== Latin ==
Emperor Justinian's codification of Roman law follows the custom of using "Titius" and "Seius" as names for Roman citizens, and "Stichus" and "Pamphilus" as names for slaves.

== Latvian ==
Sample Latvian identity cards contain the following sample names:

- Māra Paraudziņa (Mara Example) for women
- Andris Paraudziņš (Andris Example) for men

== Lithuanian ==
Vardenis Pavardenis, feminine Vardenė Pavardenė, is a placeholder in Lithuania, derived from the words for 'name' and 'surname' rather than from genuine names.

== Lojban ==
The constructed language Lojban uses the series brodV (namely broda, brode, brodi, brodo, brodu), ko'V (namely ko'a, ko'e, ko'i, ko'o, ko'u) and fo'V (namely fo'a, fo'e, fo'i, fo'o, fo'u) as pro-forms with explicitly assigned antecedents. However, Lojban speakers had begun to use them as placeholder words, especially in technical discussions on the language. To distinguish both uses, some special markers were created to unambiguously differentiate between anaphoric and metasyntactic usage.

== Malaysia ==
- Cik Kiah (Ms. Kiah), a derivative of the name Makcik Kiah (auntie Kiah), a name made up by PM Tan Sri Muhyiddin to illustrate an average Malaysian: a Pisang goreng seller earning the median rural income.

== Mexico ==
Fulano, mengano, zutano, and perengano are words that are used to refer to someone when their name is not known or is not wanted to be said.

== Netherlands ==
- Jan Modaal ("John Modal"), used to refer to those with a median income
- Henk en Ingrid, used by politician Geert Wilders
- Jan met de pet ("John with the cap")

== Nigeria ==
- Lagbaja, literally 'someone' in the Yoruba language.

== Norwegian ==
In Norwegian, Ola Nordmann (male) and Kari Nordmann (female) are used as placeholder names; they combine common Norwegian first names with a surname that literally translates to "Norwegian".

== Persian-speaking countries (e.g. Afghanistan, Iran, Tajikistan) ==
- فلانی (Folānī): Loan word from Arabic, which is used in Persian for both male and female subjects.
- یارو (Yarū): Mainly derogatory, and associated strongly with the Tehrani dialect. Is used to mean "that person over there".

== Philippines ==
- Juan dela Cruz (male), María dela Cruz or Juana dela Cruz (female)

== Polish ==
=== Things ===
The noun wihajster (from German Wie heißt er? lit. 'What is he called?') can refer to a (usually) handheld tool or device.

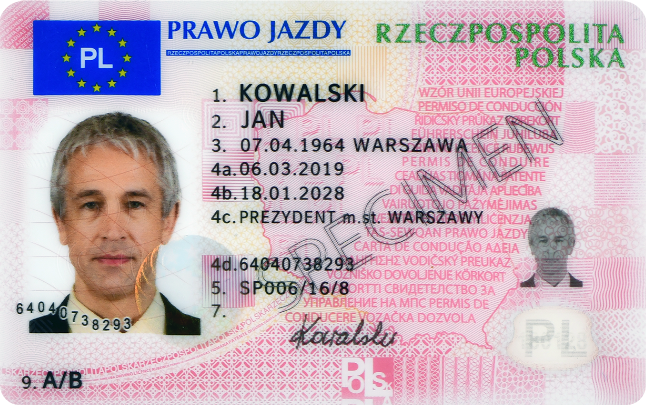
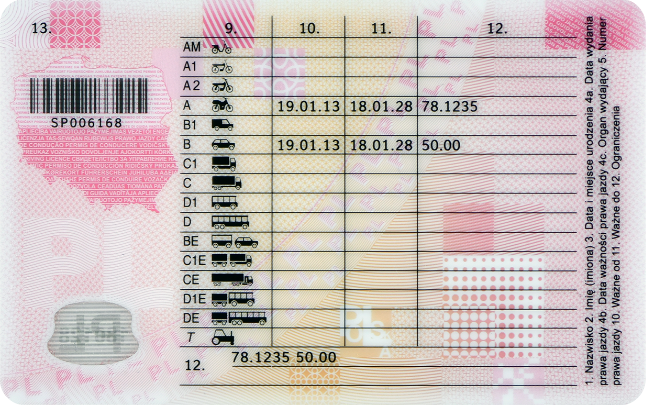
A Polish driving license issued to "Jan Kowalski".

=== Persons ===
A universal placeholder name for a man is Jan Kowalski (kowal meaning "(black)smith"); for a woman, Anna Kowalska. Kowalski is the second most common Polish surname. A second unspecified person would be called Nowak ("Newman"), with the choice of first name being left to the author's imagination, often also Jan for a man; this surname is unisex. Jan is one of the most popular male first names in Polish, and Kowalski and Nowak are the most popular Polish surnames. For a broader representation of average Poles, Kowalski may be grouped with other common surnames such as Nowak, Malinowski or Wiśniewski.

- Iksiński a surname formed in accordance with the rules of creating Polish surnames with the common suffix -ski/-ska, but the basis for its creation was the letter X (pronounced "iks" in Polish), which is used to denote unknowns (e.g. in mathematical operations). It is used especially in situations where one wants to emphasise that the person one is talking about is not anyone in particular or that the identity of that person cannot be given. When talking about another such person in a single utterance, one can use the surname Igrekowski, which is derived from the letter Y (pronounced in Polish as "igrek"). Both surnames also have female forms, Iksińska and Igrekowska respectively. No living Polish citizen bears these surnames (as of 2024).

== Portugal/Brazil ==
- Fulano de Tal (from Arabic), Sicrano (unknown etymology), Beltrano (from given name Beltrão) "Fulano, Sicrano e Beltrano" equivalent to "Tom, Dick and Harry"
- Zé Ninguém (literally Joe Nobody), equivalent to "Mister Nobody"
- Zé da Silva, from José (the most common male name in Brazil) and da Silva (the most common surname in Brazil)

== Romanian ==
La mama dracului or "where the devil's mother dwells" is the placeholder for a location in Romania.

- Cutărescu, general term used in order to avoid a specific surname; a no-name

== Russian ==
=== Universal ===
A large number of placeholder words for people, things, and actions are derived from Russian profanity (mat), as may be found in multiple dictionaries of Russian slang.

An informal placeholder (for persons, places, etc.) is "такой-то" ("takoy-to" (masculine form; feminine: takaya-to; neuter: takoye-to), meaning "this or that", "such and such", etc.).

=== Persons ===
A historical placeholder for a personal name used in legal documents and prayers is "имярек" ("imyarek"), derived from the archaic expression "imya rek" meaning "having said the name". The word entered into a common parlance as well.

To refer to an unknown person, the words "nekto", "kto-to", etc., equivalent to "someone", are used, as in "Someone stole my wallet".

Placeholders for personal names include variations on names Иван (Ivan), Пётр (Pyotr/Peter), and Сидор (Sidor), such as Иван Петрович Сидоров (Ivan Petrovich Sidorov) for a full name, or Иванов (Ivanov) for a last name; deliberately fake name-patronymic-surname combinations use one of them for all three, with the most widely used being Ivan Ivanovich Ivanov. Their placeholder function may be seen in old Russian textbooks: in arithmetical problems or sentences to illustrate grammar.

The name Vasya Pupkin (Russian: Вася Пупкин) may be used as a placeholder name for an average random or unknown person in the colloquial speech.

=== Places ===
- Various city names are often employed as placeholders. For instance, to denote a remote, obscure place:
  - Тьмутаракань (Tmutarakan, an ancient Black Sea port which sounds in modern Russian something like "dark cockroach city", тьма таракан)
- In some occasions in literature (a novel by famous Russian and Ukrainian writer Nikolai Gogol) unknown or deliberately unidentified places are referred to as ...ское место (featuring a widespread adjective ending ской).
- Latin N is sometimes used as a placeholder for the actual name of the site, e.g. город N ("city N").

== Serbia ==
Petar Petrović is the most often used name in examples of how to fill out documents, payment slips etc, alongside the street name Petra Petrovića and the town of Petrovac. Other names: Jovan Jovanović, Marko Marković, Lazar Lazarević, Ivan Ivanović, Pero Perić.

== Somalia ==
- "Macawiisley" (anglicised as "ma'awisley", literally meaning "sarong-wearer")

== Spanish ==
=== Time ===
- Indefinite time in the past:
  - tiempos de Maricastaña, "times of Maricastaña", probably in reference to María Castaña, a little known 14th century woman.
  - cuando reinó Carolo, "when Charles reigned". The origin is unclear, the most viable hypothesis is that it refers to Charles III of Spain: on a frontispiece of a gate in Alcalá de Henares in the Community of Madrid there used to be an inscription "REGE CAROLO III ANNO MDCCLXXVIII". While the king ruled in 18th century, the Latin text and Roman numerals gave an impression of antiquity.

=== Spanish (Europe) ===
==== Persons ====
Placeholder names in the Spanish language might have a pejorative or derogatory feeling to them, depending on the context.

- Perico (masculine) Perico de los palotes (a fool with (drum)sticks) or Juan de los palotes. The fool in question was a jester with a drum who accompanied a town crier, with the latter collecting salary and tips for both of them, and taking lion's share; hence the indignation implied in the phrases, such as "Who do you think I am, a fool with sticks?". "El Perico de los Palotes" was one of numerous pseudonyms of Manuel Gutiérrez Nájera.
- (feminine) Rita la Cantaora ("Rita the Singer") in reference to a woman who would do something one doesn't want to do oneself: "Let Rita la Cantaora". Rita de Cantaora was actually Rita Giménez García, see her article about the origin of the expression.

==== Places ====
- El quinto pino (lit. "the fifth pine"), el quinto carajo, la quinta porra, la quinta puñeta or el quinto infierno are colloquially used to refer to an unspecified remote place. E.g.: Nos perdimos y acabamos en el quinto pino ("We got lost and ended up in the fifth pine")
- Donde Cristo perdió el gorro/las sandalias ("where Christ lost his cap/his sandals") and donde San Pedro perdió el mechero ("where Saint Peter lost his lighter") E.g.: Trotski fue exiliado a Alma Ata, que está, más o menos, donde Cristo perdió el gorro ("Trotski was exiled to Alma Ata, which is, more or less, where Christ lost his cap").
- En las Chimbambas (or Quimbambas) is, according to the Real Academia, a colloquial "distant or imprecise place". Also used with the intensifier lejanas ("faraway"), thus En las lejanas Chimbambas ("in faraway Chimbamba-land" or "in faraway Chimbambistan").
- En el culo del mundo ("in the ass end of the world") doesn't have the same meaning as in English. It is only mildly derogatory, and its primary meaning is the same as "back of nowhere".

=== Spanish (South and Central America) ===
The name "Juan Pérez" is used like "John Doe" in Mexico and Bolivia.

- Fulano, from Arabic, Mengano, Zutano. "Fulano, Mengano y Zutano" equivalent to "Tom, Dick and Harry"
- Perico el de los palotes

== Sweden ==
- Svensson (a common surname) or Medelsvensson (literally "middle/average Svensson")

== Thailand ==
- Somchai (common name for male – literally meaning "appropriate for a man"), Somsri (common, if somewhat dated, name for female), Sommai (common names of either gender), nai-gor (นาย ก equivalent to 'Mr. A')

== United Kingdom, United States, and Canada ==
=== Companies and organizations ===
In English, "Ace" and "Acme" are popular in company names as positioning words in alphabetical directories. It has been claimed to be an acronym, either for "A Company Making Everything", "American Companies Make Everything", or "American Company that Manufactures Everything". ("Acme" is a regular English word from the Ancient Greek ἀκμή, akme meaning summit, highest point, extremity or peak, and thus sometimes used for "best".) A well-known example of "Acme" as a placeholder name is the Acme Corporation, whose (defective) products are often seen in the Wile E. Coyote and the Road Runner cartoons.

"Joe's Diner" most often describes a small, local business contrasted against large businesses or franchises. The corresponding phrase "Eat at Joe's" is a complementary fictional or hypothetical typical advertisement for such an establishment, and has itself become a snowclone in the form of X at Joe's, Eat at Y's, or simply X at Y's. The expression was frequently used as a gag in the Warner Bros. and MGM cartoons during the 1940s, typically used when an image of a neon sign or other complicated tubing would appear. A "Joe's Diner" is an example of a genericized trademark that would likely be unsuccessful suing another Joe's Diner for trademark infringement, due to the commonality of its meaning. Although there are franchises that use this name, there are many real eating establishments named "Joe's Diner". A famous example is the Joe's Diner located in Lee, Massachusetts, which was the subject of Norman Rockwell's work "The Runaway". The grocery store chain Trader Joe's uses "Joe's Diner" as its imprint for certain store brand frozen entrees. In Scotland, Jock Tamson's bairns is another common placeholder name.

"Morley" is a fictional brand of cigarettes whose packaging resembles Marlboro's original packaging. The fictional brand has appeared in various television shows, films, and video games that otherwise have no apparent connection to each other. The name "Morley" is a play on "Marleys", a nickname for Marlboro cigarettes. Morleys appear at least as far back as 1960, in Alfred Hitchcock's film Psycho. There is also a Morley Lights version, in a gold and white package (similar to Marlboro Lights), marked "Lights".Morleys were iconically smoked by the Cigarette Smoking Man, a major character of the sci-fi TV series The X-Files. The Morley Cigarettes packet is noted as one of the most recognizable props used throughout the series. The Morley packaging is sold to production companies by the Earl Hays Press, a century-old Hollywood prop packaging service. Using non-brand name products like Morley cigarettes dates back to early American television. Cigarette companies often sponsored entire TV shows and advertised through product placement, but if no cigarette companies agreed to pay, producers instead used a non-brand product.

=== Computing ===
Placeholder names are commonly used in computing. Foo and bar are commonly used as placeholders for file, function and variable names.

Certain domain names in the format example.tld (such as example.com, example.net, and example.org) are officially reserved as placeholders for the purpose of presentation. The term "test user" is also used as a placeholder name during software tests.

=== Places and estates ===
Anytown, USA, in particular, is one of the many placeholder names used in the American vernacular to describe a stereotypical small American town.

Podunk is used in American English for a hypothetical small town regarded as typically dull or insignificant, a place in the U.S. that is unlikely to have been heard of. Another example is East Cupcake to refer to a generic small town in the Midwestern United States.

In New Zealand English, Woop Woops (or, alternatively, Wop-wops) is a (generally humorous) name for an out-of-the-way location, usually rural and sparsely populated. The similar Australian English Woop Woop (or, less frequently, Woop Woops) can refer to any remote location, or outback town or district. Another New Zealand English term with a similar use is Waikikamukau ("Why kick a moo-cow"), a generic name for a small rural town.

Blackacre, Whiteacre, Greenacre, Brownacre, and variations are the placeholder names used for fictitious estates in land. The names are used by professors of law in common law jurisdictions, particularly in the area of real property and occasionally in contracts, to discuss the rights of various parties to a piece of land. Where more than one estate is needed to demonstrate a point—perhaps relating to a dispute over boundaries, easements or riparian rights—a second estate will usually be called Whiteacre, a third, Greenacre, and a fourth, Brownacre.

=== Science ===
In chemistry, tentative or hypothetical elements are assigned provisional names until their existence is confirmed by IUPAC. Historically, this placeholder name would follow Mendeleev's nomenclature; since the Transfermium wars, however, the consensus has been to assign a systematic element name based on the element's atomic number.

Element names from the periodic table are used in some hospitals as a placeholder for patient names, ex. Francium Male. Hospitals also use placeholder names for newborn babies.

=== Sports ===
Placeholder identities are often used across multiple sports for a variety of reasons, usually involving an ongoing branding process. Examples include the National Hockey League's Utah Hockey Club, who played their inaugural season under the moniker while developing their permanent identity (ultimately the Mammoth); the National Football League's Washington Football Team, who played two seasons with the name after switching away from Redskins due to the longstanding name controversy, and before unveiling the Commanders brand; and the minor-league Pacific Coast League's Oklahoma City Baseball Club, who played one season with the identity after dropping the major-league-affiliate Dodgers name in favor of developing a more unique brand (ultimately the Comets).

== Vietnam ==
Generic names in Vietnam often follow the formula: Common surname + Văn (male)/Thị (female) + Letter. For example:

- Nguyễn Văn A
- Nguyễn Văn B
- Trần Thị C

== Yiddish ==
- Chaim Yankel

== Ungrouped ==
- Average Joe
- Everyman
- Man on (or in) the street
- Normie
- Man on the Clapham omnibus (a hypothetical ordinary and reasonable person in legal context)

== See also ==
- Placeholder name
  - List of English-language placeholder names for people
  - Placeholder names in cryptography
- Metasyntactic variable
- Placeholder word
- Everyman
- Everyman's right
- Commoner
- Lorem ipsum
- Fictional company
- Fictional brand
- Independent Studio Services § Fictional brands
- Dummy pronoun
- Nonce word
- Expletive attributive
