= Lower middle class =

Social class which is a sub-division of the greater middle class

In developed nations around the world, the lower middle class is a subdivision of the greater middle class. Universally, the term refers to the group of middle class households or individuals who have not attained the status of the middle or upper middle class associated with the higher realms of the middle class, hence the name.

== United Kingdom ==
The British lower middle class, when described historically, primarily consisted of office workers: when describing class segregation of housing in the Nottingham of 1901, clerks, bookkeepers, estate agents and teachers are described as having been lower middle class. Researchers today sometimes equate NRS social grade C1, "Supervisory, clerical and junior managerial, administrative and professional", with "lower middle class".

In the nineteenth century, the middle and lower middle classes were able to live in suburbs due to the development of horse-drawn omnibuses and railways. One radical Liberal politician (Charles Masterman), writing in 1909 used "the Middle Classes" and "the suburbans" synonymously. In the early twenty-first century, there were no Mosaic 2010 geodemographic groups where the proportion of residents in NRS social grade C1 was rated as "high" or "low" in the 2010 Index; it was rated as "average" in all Mosaic groups, whether these were of a suburban, rural, city or small-town nature.

Some researchers conceive of the lower middle class as consisting of those who work in lower-grade service-sector managerial jobs or semi-professions (the lower-grade service class in Oesch 2006) and small business owners. Prior to the expansion in higher education from the 1960s onwards, members of this class generally did not have a university education.

Members of the lower middle class typically speak in local accents, although relatively mild. Votes in this area are split and minority parties will have a stronger proportion.

== United States ==
In American society, the middle class may be divided into two or three sub-groups. When divided into two parts, the lower middle class, also sometimes simply referred to as "middle class", consists of roughly one third of households, roughly twice as large as the upper middle or managerial class. Common occupation fields are semi-professionals, such as lower-level managers, small business owners and skilled craftsmen. These individuals commonly have some college education or perhaps a Bachelor's degree and earn a comfortable living. Already among the largest social classes, rivaled only by the working class, the American lower middle class is diverse and growing.

Though not common in sociological models, the middle class may be divided into three sections in vernacular language usage. In this system the term lower middle class relates to the demographic referred to as working class in most sociological models. Yet some class models, such as those by sociologist Leonard Beeghley, suggest the middle class to be one cohesive socio-economic demographic, including the demographics otherwise referred to as lower, simply middle or upper middle class in one group comprising about 45% of households.

=== Social class in the US at a glance ===
Academic class models
Dennis Gilbert, 2002		William Thompson & Joseph Hickey, 2005		Leonard Beeghley, 2004	
Class	Typical characteristics	Class	Typical characteristics	Class	Typical characteristics
Capitalist class (1%)	Top-level executives, high-rung politicians, heirs. Ivy League education common.	Upper class (1%)	Top-level executives, celebrities, heirs; income of $500,000+ common. Ivy League education common.	The super-rich (0.9%)	Multi-millionaires whose incomes commonly exceed $3.5 million or more; includes celebrities and powerful executives/politicians. Ivy League education common.
Upper middle class^{[1]} (15%)	Highly-educated (often with graduate degrees), most commonly salaried, professionals and middle management with large work autonomy.	Upper middle class^{[1]} (15%)	Highly-educated (often with graduate degrees) professionals & managers with household incomes varying from the high 5-figure range to commonly above $100,000.	The rich (5%)	Households with net worth of $1 million or more; largely in the form of home equity. Generally have college degrees.
Upper middle class^{[1]} (15%)	Highly-educated (often with graduate degrees), most commonly salaried, professionals and middle management with large work autonomy.	Upper middle class^{[1]} (15%)	Highly-educated (often with graduate degrees) professionals & managers with household incomes varying from the high 5-figure range to commonly above $100,000.	Middle class (plurality/ majority?; ca. 46%)	College-educated workers with considerably higher-than-average incomes and compensation; a man making $57,000 and a woman making $40,000 may be typical.
Lower middle class (30%)	Semi-professionals and craftsmen with a roughly average standard of living. Most have some college education and are white-collar.	Lower middle class (32%)	Semi-professionals and craftsmen with some work autonomy; household incomes commonly range from $35,000 to $75,000. Typically, some college education.	Middle class (plurality/ majority?; ca. 46%)	College-educated workers with considerably higher-than-average incomes and compensation; a man making $57,000 and a woman making $40,000 may be typical.
Working class (30%)	Clerical and most blue-collar workers whose work is highly routinized. Standard of living varies depending on number of income earners, but is commonly just adequate. High school education.	Lower middle class (32%)	Semi-professionals and craftsmen with some work autonomy; household incomes commonly range from $35,000 to $75,000. Typically, some college education.	Middle class (plurality/ majority?; ca. 46%)	College-educated workers with considerably higher-than-average incomes and compensation; a man making $57,000 and a woman making $40,000 may be typical.
Working class (30%)	Clerical and most blue-collar workers whose work is highly routinized. Standard of living varies depending on number of income earners, but is commonly just adequate. High school education.	Working class (32%)	Clerical, pink- and blue-collar workers with often low job security; common household incomes range from $16,000 to $30,000. High school education.	Working class (ca. 40–45%)	Blue-collar workers and those whose jobs are highly routinized with low economic security; a man making $40,000 and a woman making $26,000 may be typical. High school education.
Working poor (13%)	Service, low-rung clerical and some blue-collar workers. High economic insecurity and risk of poverty. Some high school education.	Working class (32%)	Clerical, pink- and blue-collar workers with often low job security; common household incomes range from $16,000 to $30,000. High school education.	Working class (ca. 40–45%)	Blue-collar workers and those whose jobs are highly routinized with low economic security; a man making $40,000 and a woman making $26,000 may be typical. High school education.
Working poor (13%)	Service, low-rung clerical and some blue-collar workers. High economic insecurity and risk of poverty. Some high school education.	Lower class (ca. 14–20%)	Those who occupy poorly-paid positions or rely on government transfers. Some high school education.	Working class (ca. 40–45%)	Blue-collar workers and those whose jobs are highly routinized with low economic security; a man making $40,000 and a woman making $26,000 may be typical. High school education.
Underclass (12%)	Those with limited or no participation in the labor force. Reliant on government transfers. Some high school education.	Lower class (ca. 14–20%)	Those who occupy poorly-paid positions or rely on government transfers. Some high school education.	The poor (ca. 12%)	Those living below the poverty line with limited to no participation in the labor force; a household income of $18,000 may be typical. Some high school education.
References: Gilbert, D. (2002) The American Class Structure: In An Age of Growing Inequality. Belmont, CA: Wadsworth, ISBN 0534541100. Thompson, W. & Hickey, J. (2005). Society in Focus. Boston, MA: Pearson, Allyn & Bacon; Beeghley, L. (2004). The Structure of Social Stratification in the United States. Boston, MA: Pearson, Allyn & Bacon.^{1} The upper middle class may also be referred to as "Professional class" Ehrenreich, B. (1989). The Inner Life of the Middle Class. NY, NY: Harper-Collins.

== See also ==
- Middle class
- Social class in the United Kingdom
- Underclass
- Upper class
- Upper middle class
- Working class
- Petit bourgeoisie
