= Normie (slang) =

Slang term

Normie is a slang word that refers to a "normal person" with typical hobbies, fashion, interests and common social attitudes. The word was borrowed into Russian in its plural form, нормис normis, which has become singular in Russian and was further pluralized: нормисы normisy.

== History ==
It was first used in its original meaning of "ordinary, normal" in English in the 1950s. According to Merriam-Webster, the term "normie" appeared in the late 1980s in the United States. It was used ironically by people with disabilities in reference to the rest of the population. In the late 1990s, the term was used in Alcoholics Anonymous literature to refer to individuals who were not addicted to any substances.

Since the early 2000s it has been spreading on the Internet. In the Russian-language sphere, popularization was promoted by the use of the imageboard Dvach, whose users consider themselves representatives of informal culture, which is expressed in controversial publications, non-standard political views, black humor, and involvement in various subcultures.

== Characteristics ==
A normie is a person who has no distinctive personality traits, who adheres to generally accepted, mainstream views, interests, tastes and habits. They usually lead a sedentary lifestyle, and are not interested in or well-informed on political and cultural issues, and do not belong to any community. Normies may be despised by members of the counterculture, who consider themselves outcasts, whose habits and interests are not generally accepted. The views of normies do not contradict the majority opinion, and their hobbies and interests are understandable to society.

The term has an offensive connotation and is often used ironically.

According to Yandex analysts, the word "normis" was one of the most popular neologisms in Russia in 2024 and the web portal gramota.ru dedicated to Russian language shortlisted it in the nomination for the 2024 Word of the Year.

== See also ==
- Average Joe
