= Waikikamukau =

Generic name for a small rural town in New Zealand

Waikikamukau (/waɪkɪkɑːmuːkaʊ/, as if saying "Why kick a moo cow") is a generic name for a small rural town or locality in New Zealand. New Zealanders use the name as a placeholder name for "any town" or to denote a non-specific but remote rural town. It has a similar connotation to the New Zealand slang Wop Wops and the Australian term Woop Woop and other appellations such as the "Boondocks" or "Timbuktu". The name is a joking reference to the frequency of New Zealand place names starting with "Wai" (Māori for water, and used in the names of many rivers and nearby towns).

It was used as the name of a successful racehorse in the 1990s.

Waikikamukau was also used as the setting for a Nickelodeon telemovie, Rocket Power: Race Across New Zealand.

== See also ==
- Māori language
- Māori influence on New Zealand English
