= Standard of living in the United States =

Median gross annual household and personal income in 2005

Median Equivalised Household Income and GDP per Capita levels in selected developed nations

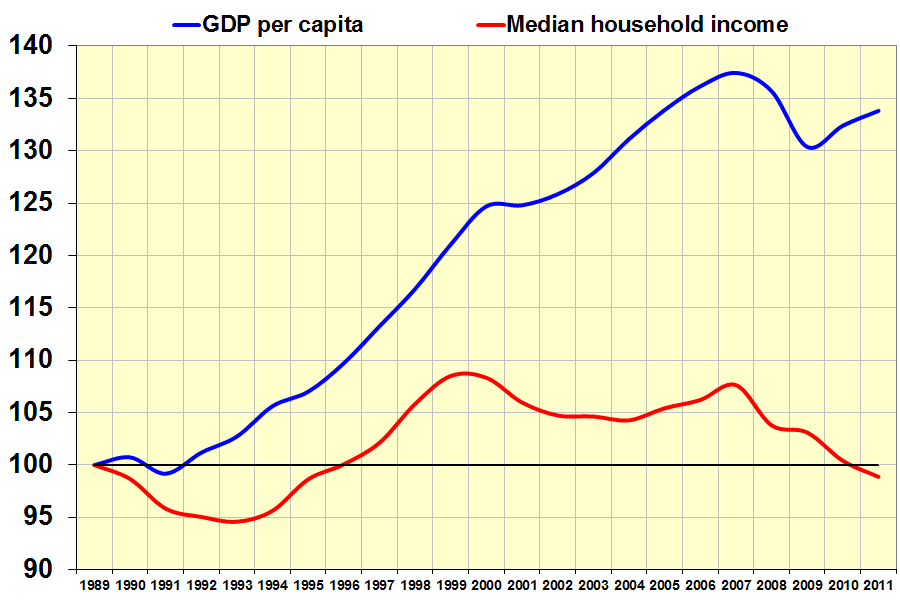
The growth in total US GDP vs median US household income

The standard of living in the United States is high by the standards that most economists use, and for most of the 20th century, the United States was widely recognized as having the highest standard of living in the world. Per capita income is high but also less evenly distributed than in most other developed countries; as a result, the United States fares particularly well in measures of average material well being that do not place weight on equality aspects.

== Measures ==
In the United Nations Human Development Index, which measures health, education, and per capita income levels, the United States is relatively high, currently ranking 8th. However, the Human Development Index is not considered a measure of living standards, but a measure of potential living standards were there no inequality: rather, the inequality-adjusted Human Development Index is considered the actual level of human development, taking inequality into account. On the inequality-adjusted HDI, the United States ranked 27th in 2014, tied with Poland.

In 2013, the Economist Intelligence Unit's Where-to-be-born Index, which takes into account material well-being as measured by GDP per capita, life expectancy, political stability, the quality of family life based on divorce rates, community life, crime and terrorism rates, gender equality, the quality of governance, climate, and unemployment rates, ranked the United States at 16th place, tied with Germany.

The OECD Better Life Index, which measures quality of life according to 11 factors, ranks the United States as 7th among 34 OECD countries.

The homeownership rate is relatively high compared to other post-industrial nations. In 2005, 69% of Americans resided in their own homes, roughly the same percentage as in the United Kingdom, Belgium, Israel and Canada. In 2007, Americans enjoyed more cars and radios per capita than any other nation and more televisions and personal computers per capita than any other nation with more than 200 million people.

== Changing over the past ==
In colonial America, the standard of living was high by 18th century standards. Americans could choose their diet from a diverse range of plants and animals from Europe and the Western Hemisphere, and this, combined with favorable weather conditions, ensured that Americans never had to deal with harvest failures. There was little exposure to epidemic diseases, and low wealth inequality, ensuring that even the poor were well-fed.

Historians have used height to measure living standards during this time as average adult heights can point to a population's net nutrition – the amount of nutrition people grew up with as compared to biological stress which can cause lower heights in adulthood, stemming from things like food deprivation, hard work, and disease. According to military records of American and European men, Americans were on average two to three inches taller than Europeans.

During the early 19th Century, according to one study, Americans were very tall by world standards “as a result of their rich and varied diets, low population density, and relative equality of wealth.”

Average heights showed little change until the second quarter of the 19th century, with the Industrial Revolution. The growth of canals, steamboats, and railways, as well as the public school system, mass immigration, and urbanization, increased exposure to diseases. Food prices rose in the 1830s, and industrialization brought along with it growing wealth inequality and business depressions that further worsened the situations of the poor. As a result, average stature and life expectancy declined, and only rebounded from 1910 to 1950, as incomes rose, urban conditions became less crowded, and public health measures were put in place.

From the 1930s up until 1980, the average American after-tax income adjusted for inflation tripled, which translated into higher living standards for the American population. Between 1949 and 1969, real median family income grew by 99.3%. From 1946 to 1978, the standard of living for the average family more than doubled. Average family income (in real terms) more than doubled from 1945 up until the 1970s, while unemployment steadily fell until it reached 4% in the 1960s. Between 1949–50 and 1965–66, median family income (in constant 2009 dollars) rose from $25,814 to $43,614, and from 1947 to 1960, consumer spending rose by a full 60%, and for the first time, as noted by Mary P. Ryan, "the majority of Americans would enjoy something called discretionary income, earnings that were secure and substantial enough to permit them to enter sectors of the marketplace that were once reserved for the affluent." In 1960, Americans were, on average, the richest people in the world by a massive margin.

During the 1960s, median family incomes increased by over 33%, while per capita expenditures on recreation and meals grew by over 40%. From 1959 to 1969, median family income (in 1984 dollars) increased from $19,300 to $26,700. By 1969, 79.6% of all households owned at least one car, 82.6% owned a refrigerator or freezer, 79% owned a black and white television set, 31.9% owned a color television set, and 70% owned a washing machine. Leisure time also increased. By 1970, it was estimated that the average workingman in America had 140 days off work each year. US work hours fell by 10.7% between 1950 and 1979, though the decline was still around half that of Western Europe.

In 1980, the American standard of living was the highest among the industrial countries, according to the OECD. Out of the 85 million households in the United States, 64% owned their own living quarters, 55% had at least two TV sets, and 51% had more than one vehicle. In terms of possession of telephones, TV sets, school enrollments, animal protein in diets, and energy consumption, the United States was far ahead of other industrialized countries. Wealthy and middle class and a majority of poor Americans had higher after-tax incomes than their counterparts almost anywhere else in the world. By 1985, the US per capita income was $11,727, one of the highest among industrialized countries. By the mid-1980s, 98% of all households had a telephone service, 77% a washing machine, 45% a freezer, and 43% a dishwasher.

In the 1990s, the average American standard of living was regarded as amongst the highest in the world, and middle class and poor Americans were still, on average, richer than their counterparts in almost all other countries, though the gap with some European countries had noticeably narrowed.

=== Current ===
The median age of US homebuyers has increased in recent decades, for both first-time buyers and repeat buyers.

In 2006, median income was $43,318 per household ($26,000 per household member) with 42% of households having two income earners. Meanwhile, the median income of the average American age 25+ was roughly $32,000 ($39,000 if only counting those employed full-time between the ages of 25 and 64) in 2005. According to the CIA the gini index which measures income inequality (the higher the less equal the income distribution) was clocked at 41.5 in 2019, compared to 30.8 in the European Union and 31.7 in Germany.

The US has... a per capita GDP [PPP] of $42,000... The [recent] onrush of technology largely explains the gradual development of a "two-tier labor market"... Since 1975, practically all the gains in household income have gone to the top 20% of households... The rise in GDP in 2004 and 2005 was undergirded by substantial gains in labor productivity... Long-term problems include inadequate investment in economic infrastructure, rapidly rising medical and pension costs of an aging population, sizable trade and budget deficits, and stagnation of family income in the lower economic groups.

In 2014, median wealth in the United States was $44,900, which put the United States in 19th place, behind many other developed countries. In 2015, median wealth in the United States was $55,775.

The United States has one of the widest rich-poor gaps of any high-income nation today, and that gap continues to grow. Some prominent economists have warned that the widening rich-poor gap in the U.S. population is a problem that could undermine and destabilize the country's economy and standard of living. In 2006, Alan Greenspan wrote that "The income gap between the rich and the rest of the US population has become so wide, and is growing so fast, that it might eventually threaten the stability of democratic capitalism itself". In 2013, George Friedman, the head of Stratfor, wrote that the middle class' standard of living was declining, and that "If we move to a system where half of the country is either stagnant or losing ground while the other half is surging, the social fabric of the United States is at risk, and with it the massive global power the United States has accumulated."

Since 1971, the middle income was above 50% of the population in the U.S. In 2015, the middle class income was 49.9% of the population. The middle class continues to shrink and standard of living continues to decrease.

Country	Austria	Belgium	Denmark	France	Ireland	Norway	Spain	Portugal	UK	United States	Israel	Canada	Russia
Homeownership rate	56%	71%	51%	55%	42%	77%	77%	85%	64%	69%	69%	68%	72%

In 2020 Falcettoni and Nygaard wrote a paper and released a policy brief and a FEDS Note on the standard of living across the United States of America. Motivated by the fact that economists mainly focus on income per capita in their analyses of standards of living, but that states across the United States differ along many other dimensions, they build a measure of living standards (à la Jones and Klenow 2016) that accounts for cross-state variations in mortality, consumption, education, inequality, and cost of living. They find that per-capita income is a good indicator of the level of living standards across the United States, but that deviations can be significant for some states. They also find that the level of living standards in most states appears closer to the level of living standards in the richest state, Connecticut, than the difference in their per-capita income levels would imply. In particular, their measure highlights that high-income states benefit from higher life expectancy, consumption, and college attainment, while low-income states benefit from lower cost of living. The state with the highest living standards according to their measure is Minnesota.

Finally, Falcettoni and Nygaard conclude by analyzing whether and how living standards have been rising across the United States between 1999 and 2015. They find that every state has experienced a rise in living standards, but that states differ significantly in how fast their living standards are rising. They find that the main reason for the difference in how fast living standards are rising across the United States is due to varying gains in life expectancy, consumption, and college attainment in the different states. This is a cautionary tale for economists using per-capita income growth as a proxy for how fast living standards are rising in any given state in the United States. In fact, Falcettoni and Nygaard find that per-capita income growth is only weakly correlated with how fast living standards are rising and deviations can be significantly large.

== International rankings ==
Index	Rank
Human Development Index	17th out of 189 pop
GDP (PPP) per capita	9th out of 183
GDP (nominal) per capita	8th out of 183
Where-to-be-born Index	13th out of 71
Human Poverty Index	17th out of 19

== Social class ==
Standard of living in the United States varies considerably with socio-economic status. The table below gives a summarization of prominent academic theories on the socio-economic stratification of the United States:

Academic class models
Dennis Gilbert, 2002		William Thompson & Joseph Hickey, 2005		Leonard Beeghley, 2004	
Class	Typical characteristics	Class	Typical characteristics	Class	Typical characteristics
Capitalist class (1%)	Top-level executives, high-rung politicians, heirs. Ivy League education common.	Upper class (1%)	Top-level executives, celebrities, heirs; income of $500,000+ common. Ivy League education common.	The super-rich (0.9%)	Multi-millionaires whose incomes commonly exceed $3.5 million or more; includes celebrities and powerful executives/politicians. Ivy League education common.
Upper middle class^{[1]} (15%)	Highly-educated (often with graduate degrees), most commonly salaried, professionals and middle management with large work autonomy.	Upper middle class^{[1]} (15%)	Highly-educated (often with graduate degrees) professionals & managers with household incomes varying from the high 5-figure range to commonly above $100,000.	The rich (5%)	Households with net worth of $1 million or more; largely in the form of home equity. Generally have college degrees.
Upper middle class^{[1]} (15%)	Highly-educated (often with graduate degrees), most commonly salaried, professionals and middle management with large work autonomy.	Upper middle class^{[1]} (15%)	Highly-educated (often with graduate degrees) professionals & managers with household incomes varying from the high 5-figure range to commonly above $100,000.	Middle class (plurality/ majority?; ca. 46%)	College-educated workers with considerably higher-than-average incomes and compensation; a man making $57,000 and a woman making $40,000 may be typical.
Lower middle class (30%)	Semi-professionals and craftsmen with a roughly average standard of living. Most have some college education and are white-collar.	Lower middle class (32%)	Semi-professionals and craftsmen with some work autonomy; household incomes commonly range from $35,000 to $75,000. Typically, some college education.	Middle class (plurality/ majority?; ca. 46%)	College-educated workers with considerably higher-than-average incomes and compensation; a man making $57,000 and a woman making $40,000 may be typical.
Working class (30%)	Clerical and most blue-collar workers whose work is highly routinized. Standard of living varies depending on number of income earners, but is commonly just adequate. High school education.	Lower middle class (32%)	Semi-professionals and craftsmen with some work autonomy; household incomes commonly range from $35,000 to $75,000. Typically, some college education.	Middle class (plurality/ majority?; ca. 46%)	College-educated workers with considerably higher-than-average incomes and compensation; a man making $57,000 and a woman making $40,000 may be typical.
Working class (30%)	Clerical and most blue-collar workers whose work is highly routinized. Standard of living varies depending on number of income earners, but is commonly just adequate. High school education.	Working class (32%)	Clerical, pink- and blue-collar workers with often low job security; common household incomes range from $16,000 to $30,000. High school education.	Working class (ca. 40–45%)	Blue-collar workers and those whose jobs are highly routinized with low economic security; a man making $40,000 and a woman making $26,000 may be typical. High school education.
Working poor (13%)	Service, low-rung clerical and some blue-collar workers. High economic insecurity and risk of poverty. Some high school education.	Working class (32%)	Clerical, pink- and blue-collar workers with often low job security; common household incomes range from $16,000 to $30,000. High school education.	Working class (ca. 40–45%)	Blue-collar workers and those whose jobs are highly routinized with low economic security; a man making $40,000 and a woman making $26,000 may be typical. High school education.
Working poor (13%)	Service, low-rung clerical and some blue-collar workers. High economic insecurity and risk of poverty. Some high school education.	Lower class (ca. 14–20%)	Those who occupy poorly-paid positions or rely on government transfers. Some high school education.	Working class (ca. 40–45%)	Blue-collar workers and those whose jobs are highly routinized with low economic security; a man making $40,000 and a woman making $26,000 may be typical. High school education.
Underclass (12%)	Those with limited or no participation in the labor force. Reliant on government transfers. Some high school education.	Lower class (ca. 14–20%)	Those who occupy poorly-paid positions or rely on government transfers. Some high school education.	The poor (ca. 12%)	Those living below the poverty line with limited to no participation in the labor force; a household income of $18,000 may be typical. Some high school education.
References: Gilbert, D. (2002) The American Class Structure: In An Age of Growing Inequality. Belmont, CA: Wadsworth, ISBN 0534541100. Thompson, W. & Hickey, J. (2005). Society in Focus. Boston, MA: Pearson, Allyn & Bacon; Beeghley, L. (2004). The Structure of Social Stratification in the United States. Boston, MA: Pearson, Allyn & Bacon.^{1} The upper middle class may also be referred to as "Professional class" Ehrenreich, B. (1989). The Inner Life of the Middle Class. NY, NY: Harper-Collins.

== See also ==
- Affluence in the United States
- Poverty in the United States
- Personal income in the United States
- Household income in the United States
- Federal assistance in the United States
- Male-female income disparity in the US
- Social class in the United States

General:

- Gross domestic product
- International ranking of household income
- Economy of the United States
- Human Development Index
