= Divorce settlement =

Legal agreement between divorcing couples

A divorce settlement is an arrangement, adjustment, or other understanding reached, as in financial or business proceedings, between two adults who have chosen to divorce. It serves as the final legal agreement between these adults for documenting the terms of their divorce.

== Specifics ==
A divorce settlement entails which spouse gets what property and what responsibilities once the marriage is over. "It deals with child custody and visitation, child support, alimony, health and life insurance, real estate, cars, household items, bank accounts, debts, investments, retirement plans and pensions, college tuition for children, and other items of value, such as frequent flyer miles and country club memberships. Conditions regarding tax payments, legal names, and provisions for modifying the agreement may also be included."

== Types of settlements in the United States ==
=== Property Distribution ===
When a couple goes through a divorce, the allocation of their property and assets becomes necessary. Certain state laws mandate an equitable distribution of property, wherein fairness takes precedence over equal division. While equitable does not guarantee equal sharing, it ensures a fair allocation.

Alternatively, some states follow community property principles, where assets and property acquired during the marriage are considered communal. In these states, there are varying approaches to dividing community property. Some states enforce an equal division, with each party receiving fifty percent of the property, while others emphasize equitable division, aiming for fairness in distribution.

=== Child Custody Laws ===
Child custody laws, while largely similar across states, do exhibit certain variations. Generally, courts determine custody arrangements based on the "best interests of the child" standard, yet the interpretation of this standard can differ among states. Some states take into account the child's preferences, while others permit children aged 14 or older to choose their residing parent. Additionally, certain states base custody decisions on a predefined list of factors established by the state legislature.

In most states, the prevailing practice involves granting some form of joint custody, wherein both parents share physical and legal responsibilities for the child.

=== Child Support Laws ===
Each state employs a unique formula and set of guidelines to determine child support. Some states base the calculation on a percentage of the noncustodial parent's income, while others consider the income of both parents. Consequently, the use of diverse standards by different states often yields unexpected outcomes when assessing support obligations.

=== Alimony Laws ===
Alimony, also known as spousal support or spousal maintenance, is typically granted in a divorce when one spouse can demonstrate to the court their financial need for such support and the other spouse possesses the means to provide it. In most states, there are statutes outlining a range of factors that a judge must take into account when deciding whether to award alimony, including the type, amount, and duration of support. While each state has its own specific criteria, there is considerable overlap in certain factors. Common considerations by courts include the earning capacity of each spouse, the age of the parties, and the duration of the marriage.

Additionally, some states may consider factors such as the standard of living enjoyed by the couple during the marriage or even the level of fault attributed to each spouse in the divorce.

== See also ==
- Settlement (litigation)
- List of largest divorce settlements
