= Joe's Diner =

Joe's Diner may refer to

- Joe's Diner (TV series), a sequence of TV shorts created by and aired on the NFL Network
- Joe's Diner (placeholder name), a placeholder name for a fictional or hypothetical everyman's restaurant
