= Boonie =

Boonie may refer to:

- Boonie, the nickname of David Boon (b. 1960), an Australian cricket player
- Boonie, a diminutive of boondocks, a U.S. expression for a remote or rural area
- Boonie hat, a wide-brim hat commonly used by military forces
- Boonie pepper, alternative name for bird's eye chili
