= Everytown =

Everytown may refer to:

- Welcome to Everytown, a 2007 book by Julian Baggini
- Escape from Everytown, a 1995 book by Terrance Dicks
- Everytown for Gun Safety, an American nonprofit organization based in New York

== See also ==
- Anytown, USA (disambiguation)
