= Vardenis (disambiguation) =

Vardenis (Armenian: Վարդենիս [vɑɾtʰɛˈnis]) is a town in the Vardenis Municipality of Gegharkunik Province, Armenia.

Vardenis my also refer to:

- Armenian name for Altınova, Korkut, Turkey
- Vardenis, Aragatsotn, town in Aragatsotn province, Armenia
- Vardenis District, Armenian SSR
- Vardenis mountain range, Armenia, Azerbaijan
  - Mount Vardenis
- Vardenis Municipality
- Vardenis Pavardenis, Lithuanian placeholder name
