= Welcome to Woop Woop =

- Theatrical film poster
- Directed by: Stephan Elliott
- Screenplay by: Stephan Elliott; Michael Thomas
- Based on: The Dead Heart (novel) by Douglas Kennedy
- Produced by: Finola Dwyer
- Starring: Johnathon Schaech; Rod Taylor; Susie Porter; Dee Smart
- Cinematography: Mike Molloy
- Edited by: Martin Walsh
- Music by: Guy Gross
- Production company: The Australian Film Finance Corporation
- Distributed by: Roadshow Films
- Release dates: 13 May 1997 (Cannes Film Festival); 13 November 1998 (Australia)
- Running time: 106 minutes (Cannes)
- Country: Australia
- Language: English
- Budget: A$10 million
- Box office: $527,346

Welcome to Woop Woop is a 1997 Australian screwball comedy film directed by Stephan Elliott and starring Johnathon Schaech and Rod Taylor. The film was based on the novel The Dead Heart by Douglas Kennedy. "Woop Woop" is an Australian colloquialism referring to an inexact and extremely rustic and uncivilised location, usually in rural or remote Australia. Equivalent terms include "the boondocks" and "out in the sticks" in American English or "the back of beyond" in British English.

The film centres on an American traveller in Australia who is abducted and held captive in a dystopian cult. Similarly to the way the Coen Brothers' film Fargo, and its spin-off TV series mocks stereotypes about the culture of Minnesota, Welcome to Woop Woop's characters are wildly exaggerated and parodied stereotypes of Anglo-Australian Bogans from Outback desert communities.

== Plot ==
Teddy (Johnathon Schaech) is a New York City con artist, womaniser, and exotic animal smuggler who travels to Australia after a deal goes awry, his latest shipment of rare tropical birds escapes, and must be replaced. While driving through an arid desert in the Northern Territory, he picks up a hitchhiker, Angie (Susie Porter), who seduces him and asks him to drive her to the beach, as she has never seen the ocean before. After a brief and sexually ravenous 'courtship', Angie proposes marriage after they reach the seaside and when Teddy pretends to accept, Angie knocks him unconscious. When he awakes, he finds himself stranded in Woop Woop, a rusty, desolate, and dilapidated hamlet within a crater-like rock formation in the desert of central Australia.

Angie's father, Daddy-O (Rod Taylor), explains that as he has "poked her" more than once, Teddy and Angie are now considered "married" and no objections will be tolerated. Furthermore, no one ever leaves Woop Woop, on pain of death, without Daddy-O's permission, "and that is never given."

As he listens and observes, Teddy learns that Daddy-O runs Woop Woop in a brutal, cult-like, and dystopian manner, that he disguises as a commune (he and the other town elders keep the best luxuries for themselves in secret while doling out only canned pineapple and sub-par tobacco to the other members).

Woop Woop's only income source is the sale of canned dog food made from the ground-up meat of road-killed kangaroos. The only entertainment permitted by Daddy-O are old Rodgers & Hammerstein films, whose soundtracks play constantly over a loudspeaker. Meanwhile, Daddy-O and the other elders have working televisions and secretly watch football games and drink expensive beer. Comparing Daddy-O in an angry soliloquy to the Fundamentalist Mormon cult leaders with private arsenals of assault weapons that he has heard about in the past, Teddy, who had thought he was having a meaningless hookup "with the best f--- in the Southern Hemisphere", is enraged that she instead, "set me up."

After he angrily stands up to Daddy-O, Teddy learns the truth. Woop Woop was an asbestos mining town before an accident in 1979. The mine was closed down, Woop Woop was abandoned, turned into an Aboriginal Reserve, and literally "erased" from the map. Not content with the deal given to them by both the government and the mining company (resettlement in Australia's heavily populated southern coastal cities), they secretly returned to the ghost town of Woop Woop. At first, they repopulated themselves incestuously, but this caused wide mental instability. A rule was then enacted ("Rule #3: Don't diddle your cousins", which Daddio enforces by both corporal punishment and the infanticide of all disabled babies following birth). Since then, outsiders like Teddy have been occasionally kidnapped and kept against their will to deepen Woop Woop's otherwise extremely shallow gene pool.

Although other commune members now admire him for being the only person who dares to stand up to Daddy-O, Teddy hates living in Woop Woop and finds his "marriage" to the needy, overly controlling, and possessive Angie, even though she is also a blonde sex addict who looks like a model, both physically and emotionally exhausting. Seeking to escape, Teddy repairs his VW van, which has been vandalised by the locals, only to have it vandalised once again by Daddy-O.

Seeking to accept his situation, he befriends an Australian Cattle Dog, which is shot and killed by a child who is celebrating 'Dog Day.' After witnessing, 'Midget,' the Woop Woop town hairdresser, also being fatally shot by Daddy-O during an attempted escape. Teddy becomes completely determined to find a way out.

He befriends a couple of locals, including the scruffy, affable Duffy and Krystal, Midget's widow and Angie's sister, who help Teddy arrange an escape plan. Duffy, having been beaten by Daddy-O for breaking 'Rule #3,' nevertheless elects to stay in Woop Woop. Noticing Teddy's romantic interest in Krystal, Angie runs away sobbing and later announces that she is pregnant with twins.

As Krystal and Angie's mother lies dying, she advised Teddy that he has a bright future in Woop Woop and that he will replace Daddy-O when the latter dies. She then urges Teddy to come closer and whispers a secret in his ear. Afterwards, Angie asks Teddy what their twins' names should be and he indifferently suggests Sonny and Cher. Angie then tries to seduce him, but Teddy, as revenge for earlier, knocks her out, gags her, and ties her up.

During the funeral of Angie's mother, Teddy, Krystal, and Krystal's pet cockatoo climb out of the crater and try to escape in a repaired truck. Angie escapes from her ropes and runs frantically into the funeral with news of the escape attempt. Daddy-O and Angie chase after Teddy and Krystal in Daddy-O's prized kangaroo road-killing pickup truck and are about to catch them when they see the giant kangaroo that Duffy had earlier described from Aboriginal mythology. Daddy-O, as he always does when he sees live kangaroos, hits the accelerator and screams, "Farfangulah!" Instead of becoming road kill, the giant kangaroo completely totals Daddy-O's truck. Angie sobs inconsolably as Teddy and Krystal drive away.

Krystal admits that she feels bad about Teddy abandoning Angie while she is pregnant, but Teddy explains that the secret their dying mother whispered to him is that Angie's pregnancy is a lie to keep him from choosing Krystal instead. They both drive across the desert to freedom to the sound of the Robin S. version of Rodgers and Hammerstein's You'll never walk alone.

More than a decade later, Teddy and Krystal are living in a New York City apartment when, in a post-credits scene, they unexpectedly are visited by a now teenaged Sonny and Cher.

== Cast ==
- Johnathon Schaech as Teddy
- Rod Taylor as Daddy-O
- Susie Porter as Angie
- Dee Smart as Krystal
- Richard Moir as Reggie
- Maggie Kirkpatrick as Ginger
- Barry Humphries as Blind Wally
- Mark Wilson as Duffy
- Paul Mercurio as Midget
- Baden Jones as Leon
- Rachel Griffiths as Sylvia
- Tina Louise as Bella
- Felix Williamson as Jerome
- Chelsea Brown as Maude

== Soundtrack ==
A soundtrack was released by Universal Music Group.

1. "Perhaps, Perhaps, Perhaps" - Cake
2. "There is Nothin' Like a Dame" - Reel Big Fish
3. "Timebomb" - Chumbawamba
4. "I Can't Say No" - Poe
5. "Welcome to Your Life (Woop, Woop)" - Boy George
6. "I Got You Babe" - Merril Bainbridge and Shaggy
7. "Bali Ha'i" - Moodswings and Neneh Cherry
8. "Dog's Life" - eels
9. "You'll Never Walk Alone" - Robin S.
10. "Climb Every Mountain" - Peggy Wood and Junior Vasquez

== Release ==
=== Critical reception ===
On the review aggregator website Rotten Tomatoes, 37% of 19 critics' reviews are positive, with an average rating of 4.8/10.

Elliot's earlier film release, The Adventures of Priscilla, Queen of the Desert, had been a 1994 Cannes Film Festival hit. The uncompleted Welcome to Woop Woop was screened "out of competition" at the 1997 Cannes Film Festival, an experience Elliott described as "excruciating".

Australian film critic Michael Adams later included Welcome to Woop Woop on his list of the worst ever Australian films, along with Phantom Gold, The Glenrowan Affair, Houseboat Horror, The Pirate Movie, Les Patterson Saves the World and Pandemonium.

It has become a cult classic in the years following its release, notably loved by RuPaul.

=== Box office ===
Welcome to Woop Woop grossed $489,725 at the box office in Australia.

== See also ==
- Cinema of Australia
