= Tombouctou =

Tombouctou may be:

- Tombouctou Region in northern Mali
- The French name for the city of Timbuktu, which gives its name to the region

== See also ==
- Timbuktu (disambiguation)
