= Timbuktu (disambiguation) =

Timbuktu is a city in Mali.

Timbuktu and similarly spelled words may also refer to:

== Places ==
Timbuktu is a common placeholder name for a distant and remote location. Specific locations include:

- Timbuctoo, California, a ghost town and unincorporated community in Yuba County, California, U.S.
- Timbuctoo, New Jersey, a small settlement along Rancocas Creek in Westampton Township, New Jersey, U.S.
- Timbuctoo, New York, a failed farming community of Black people in the Adirondacks.
- Timbuktu (crater), an old crater on Mars
- Timbuktu, Oregon, a historic locale in Washington County, Oregon, U.S.
- Tombouctou Region, administrative subdivision of Mali

== People ==
- Timbuktu (Canadian rapper), Canadian hip hop artist
- Timbuktu (Swedish rapper), Swedish rapper, reggae and hip hop artist

== Art, entertainment, and media ==
=== Film ===
- Timboektoe (2007), a Dutch youth film
- Timbuctoo (film), a 1933 British film
- Timbuktu (1959 film), a 1959 film with Victor Mature
- Timbuktu, a 2004 film directed by Alan Gilsenan
- Timbuktu (2014 film), a 2014 French-Mauritanian film

=== Literature ===
- Timbuctoo, an 1829 poem by William Makepeace Thackeray
- Timbuctoo (novel), a 2012 novel by Tahir Shah
- Timbuctoo, a series of children's books by Roger Hargreaves, based on Mr Men and Little Miss, first published in 1978
- Timbuktu (novella), a book written by Paul Auster
- The Train to Timbuctoo, a 1951 picture book by Margaret Wise Brown

=== Music ===
- Timbuktu!, a musical play

== Brands and enterprises ==
- Timbuktu (software), a remote control software product
- Timbuk2, a line of messenger bags

== See also ==
- Tombouctou (disambiguation)
- Timbuk 3
