= Gramota.ru =

The reference and information portal Gramota.ru (Russian: Справочно-информационный портал «Грамота.ру»; stylized simply as Gramota since 2023; literally mean «Charter») is a leading Russian digital platform dedicated to the Russian language —its norms, orthography, punctuation, lexicology, stylistics, and speech culture. Initially oriented toward media professionals, it has evolved into a universal resource for a broad audience: journalists, editors, educators, students, native speakers, learners of Russian as a foreign language, and linguistics enthusiasts. «Gramota.ru» consolidates authoritative normative dictionaries, reference works, interactive exercises, expert consultations, and educational materials, contributing to the promotion of linguistic knowledge and to the improvement of literacy in the digital environment. Its mission is to provide up-to-date information on Russian-language norms, to affirm literacy as a key element of human culture, to develop original reference and educational materials, and to create digital tools for learning and communication. The platform's monthly audience exceeds 17 million users, with particular emphasis on supporting journalists, teachers, and learners of Russian as a foreign language.

== History ==
The history of the portal began on 14 November 2000, when it was launched on the recommendation of the "Russian Language in the Mass Media" commission under the Council on the Russian Language of the Government of the Russian Federation. The initiative originated from the Ministry of the Russian Federation for Press, Television, and Radio Broadcasting (now the Ministry of Digital Development, Communications and Mass Media), with the goal of creating an online dictionary and reference base to improve linguistic standards in the media. The presentation took place at the roundtable "The Russian Language on the Air: Problems and Ways to Solve Them," chaired by I. I. Khaleeva. The first editor-in-chief was Maria Bolshakova; the project was led by philologist and organizer Aleksey Kormilitsyn (1961–2013), and the editorial board was headed by Professor V. P. Neroznak (1939–2015). The board included Yu. N. Karaulov, V. V. Lopatin, Yu. E. Prokhorov, among others. Over 25 years (as of 2025), the portal has passed through key stages of development: from basic dictionaries and a reference service (since 2002) in its early years under the leadership of Yulia Safonova, interactive dictations (2002), radio programs ("Gramotei," 2003; "Govorim pravilno," 2009), and SMS Olympiads (2004), to a complete redesign in 2023 with the integration of AI for intelligent search, a metasemantic dictionary, and the "Study Guide" section. Since 2022, the general director has been Konstantin Derevyanko (Deputy Chair of the Presidential Council on the Russian Language), and since 2023 the editor-in-chief has been Kseniya Kiseleva. During this period, approximately 300,000 user inquiries have been processed.

== Content ==
The portal's content includes an extensive library of normative dictionaries (for example, the orthographic dictionary edited by V. V. Lopatin and the explanatory dictionary by S. A. Kuznetsov), reference guides on punctuation and phraseology, the "Reference Office" section for online consultations, the "Textbook" section with rules, exercises, and tongue twisters, as well as the "Library," which contains texts of Russian literature from the 11th to the 20th century. The Gramota.ru journal publishes popular-science articles, interviews, expert monologues, and language-related news, including analyses of neologisms, slang, and loanwords. For learners of Russian as a foreign language, the portal offers useful phonetic descriptions, games (such as "Balda" Russian: Балда), and reading materials. Its partners include the V. V. Vinogradov Institute of the Russian Language of the Russian Academy of Sciences (its main scholarly partner) and the A. S. Pushkin State Institute of the Russian Language, which provide the academic foundation for the project. The portal integrates AI technologies for speech synthesis and cross-search across its content (over 5 million articles). The logo featuring a snail, introduced in 2005, symbolizes the gradual growth of literacy on the Internet. In scholarly research, the portal is noted as a key resource for normative lexicography, offering unique entries from the Big Explanatory Dictionary and contributing to the critical analysis of linguistic norms.

== In society ==
The portal's influence on society is reflected in its educational initiatives, including the annual "Word of the Year" campaign: in 2025, the winner was "zoomer" (42% of the votes from 469 philologists across 23 regions), reflecting the linguistic innovations of Generation Z; the finalists were "burnout" (second place), "red flag" (third), and "prompt." The process involves expert selection of neologisms, statistical analysis (using the SKAN system), and voting, thereby stimulating public discourse on linguistic shifts such as the adaptation of loanwords ("vibe" to "vaibit") and compressives ("shchas"). Studies emphasize the portal's role as a linguocultural instrument: through its reference service and surveys, it monitors issues of speech usage, helps preserve national identity, counteracts online errors, and promotes literacy —especially among young people and Russian speakers abroad — thus reinforcing its status as the " general representation" of the Russian language on the Internet without posing any threat to its linguistic adaptability.

== Awards ==
The portal has received multiple awards for its contribution to the development of the Russian language and the Internet: four times the Runet Prize in the "Science and Education" category (2004, 2005, 2006, 2007); in 2013, the Russian Government Prize in the field of mass media; in 2024, first place in the Golden Site competition (category "Educational portal, popular-science portal, blog") and second place in the Runet Rating for its new design. It actively collaborates with federal mass media (expert assessments for Channel One, podcasts, practice exercises), organizes lectures ("Literacy Mondays"), participates in the Total Dictation campaign, in forums (for example, the 5th Kostomarov Forum in 2025 at the Pushkin Institute), and in projects such as the "Living Dictionary" (2011). In the academic sphere abroad, Gramota.ru is recommended as a resource for advanced learners (for instance, at the University of Oregon and the University of Tennessee), supporting the development of reading skills, linguistic norms, and speech culture through interactive competitions, a classics library, and reference materials for heritage learners.
