= Anytown, USA =

Anytown, USA or Anytown may refer to:

- List of placeholder names § Geographical locations, one of the many placeholder names used in the American vernacular
- Anytown (film), a 2009 drama film
- Anytown, USA (film), a 2005 documentary
- Anytown Camp, run by the National Conference for Community and Justice and their local regions
