= Peder Ås =

Fictional character

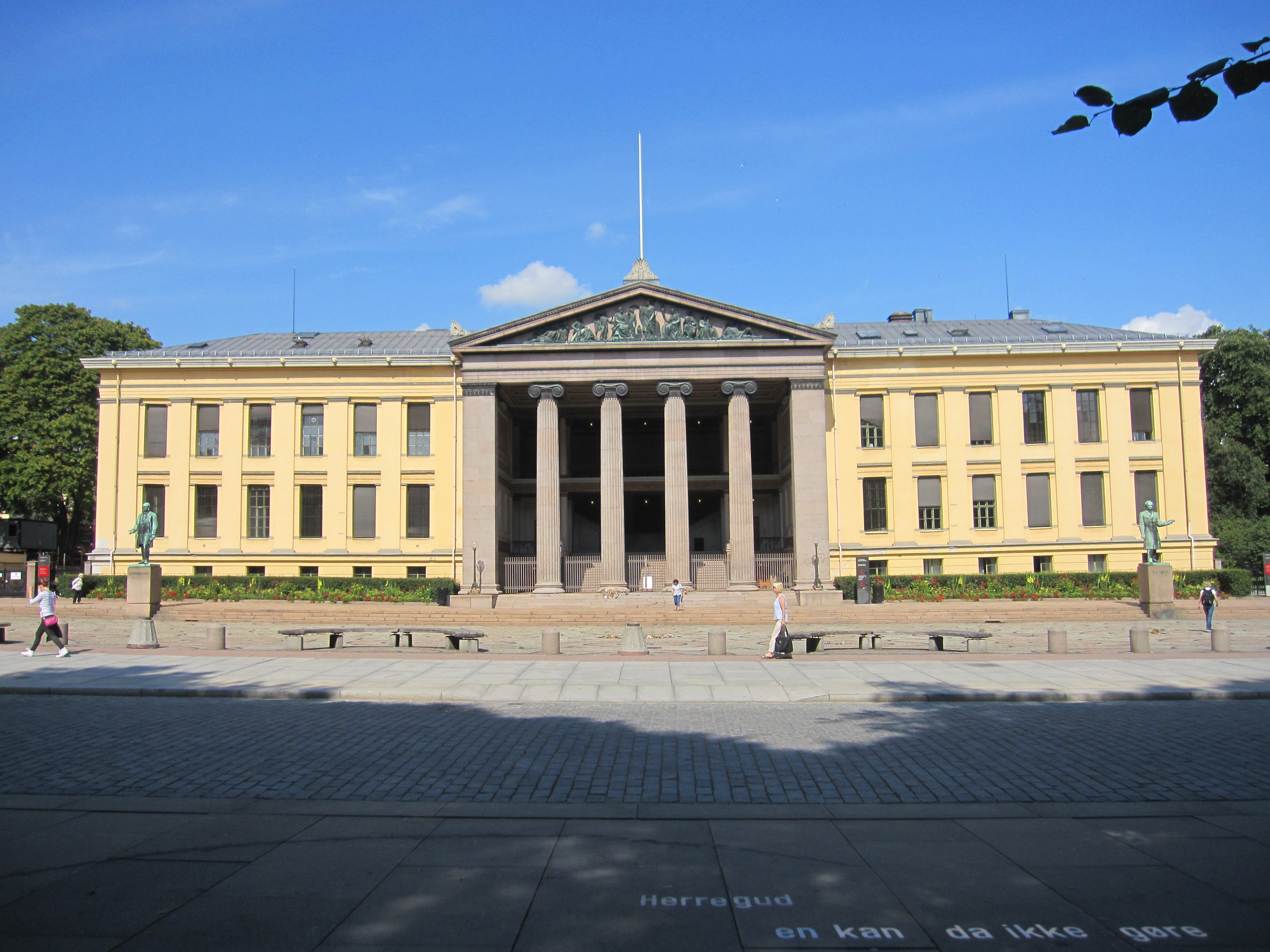
The main building of the University of Oslo Faculty of Law

Peder Ås, previously Peder Aas, is a fictional character and placeholder name used as an example in legal studies in Norway. The character is traditionally associated with the University of Oslo Faculty of Law, where it has occurred on every candidate of law exam since 1897, except in 1917. It continues to be used at all law schools in Norway. He has also been used in advertisements and plays. In the early years he was portrayed as a farmer, fisherman and lumberer, but has later been portrayed more as an Average Joe and sometimes as a businessperson.

== Use ==
The first documented occurrence of Peder Aas dates from the candidate of law at the University of Oslo exam from 1897. Nils Holm and Oline Aas were getting married; Peder Aas was Oline's deceased father who had made an agreement with the former farmer at the Holm homestead regarding use of the forest. Since then, Peder Ås has occurred on every exam at UiO, except once. He was missing from the 1917 exams, which caused chaos among the students as they were worried that part of their exam questions were missing. In the 1960s Dean Birger Stuevold Lassen introduced a new character, Carmen, in the exams. He received many negative comments from students, who were confused and Carmen was therefore not used again.

About 1980 Ås appeared in advertisements for bank cards. In 1997 the Norwegian Language Council stated that they were concerned that the term "Ola Nordmann", equivalent to "Average Joe" and meaning "Ola Norwegian" was not gender neutral enough, but at the same time explicitly stated that they did not mind "Peder Ås". In a play was put up at the University of Bergen in which the court case following the Lillelid murders in Tennessee, United States, was reenacted, the murders were committed against Peder Ås and his family.

== Characteristics ==
Lawyer Ernst G. Hansen conducted a survey of all judicial exams at UiO between 1910 and 1967 and made an assessment of Peder Ås. He was born in 1883 on the coast of Trøndelag to Oline and Tobias Ås and has four brothers and two sisters. He has been married four times and had a problematic divorce with all of them. In his early years Ås worked as a farmer, fisherman and forester, but in later years he became more of an industrialist and has among other occupations been sheriff, physician, ship-owner and gardener and has been bankrupt many times. However, he has never been a jurist. Ås is normally portrayed as an average person who often comes close to the wind. He typically occurs along with other regular characters, such as Lars Holm, Hans Tastad and Marte Kirkerud. Ås may have various relations with these, and is often married to or divorced from Kirkerud. These people normally live in the fictional village of Lillevik.
