= Vardenis Pavardenis =

Vardenis Pavardenis (feminine: Vardenė Pavardenė) is a relatively new placeholder name in Lithuania.

Vardenis Pavardenis is a placeholder that does not use real name and surname. It is derived from Lithuanian words vardas/pavardė for 'name'/'surname'. Various forms have long been using placeholders, such as Jonas Jonaitis or Petras Petraitis. As a result, in 2004, a real Jonas Jonaitis sued a credit debt collection company arguing damages due to use of his real name in collectors' databases. He also claimed moral damages, because, in his words, when he put his name on a document, the receiving side would first think that he is playing a joke.

In 2005 he won his case and his name was replaced with "Vardenis Pavardenis" in sample forms in a number of institutions, which resulted in considerable drop of the monetary amount of claims in his name. In Lithuania there was a contemplation what legal measures could prohibit the use of real names in sample forms. The new convention is now used in some governtment forms, such as ISAK-236 for marriage certificates.
