= Ethel Smith Dorrance =

American writer

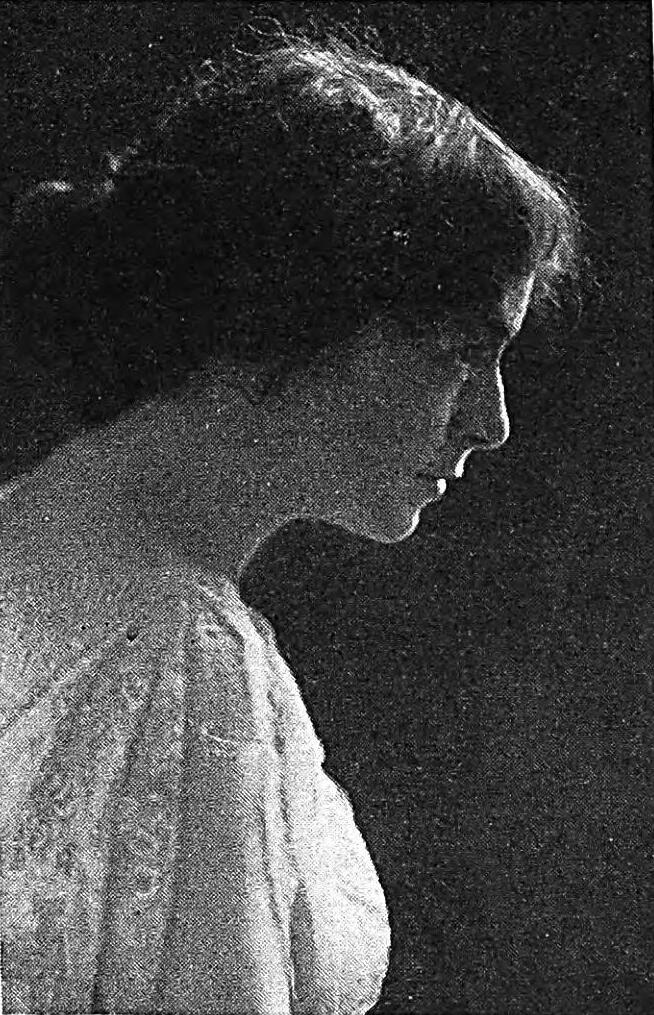
- Born: 1880; Pennsylvania
- Occupation: Writer

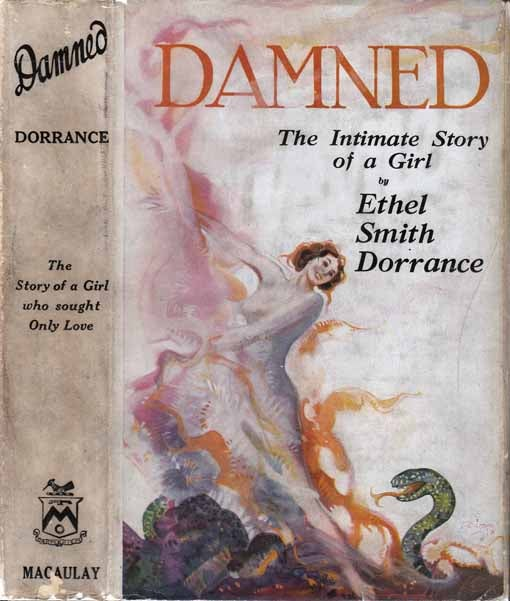
Damned: The Intimate Story Of A Girl (1923)

Ethel Arnold Smith Dorrance Hickey (1880–?) was an American writer.

Ethel Smith Dorrance was born in 1880 in Pennsylvania, the daughter of Rev. William John Smith, a Presbyterian minister.

Her most famous work was Damned: The Intimate Story Of A Girl (1923). It is the story of Dolores Trent, a woman consigned to Hell for her sexual activity who recounts her life story to Satan in a series of stories a la One Thousand and One Nights. Initially published anonymously, her name was publicly revealed when Universal Pictures purchased the film rights. When Universal declined to adapt the film, Dorrance publicly blamed the Hays Code, leading the Authors League of America to unsuccessfully intervene on her behalf.

With her husband James French Dorrance, she wrote novels and short stories in a variety of genres, mostly Westerns. These included two novels featuring Mountie Sergeant Alfred Rawson, Get Your Man (1921) and Back of Beyond (1925). Several of their works were adapted for film: His Robe of Honor (1918) from their novel of the same name and Whitewashed Walls (1919) and Who Knows? (1917) from their short stories of the same name.

== Personal life ==
She married James French Dorrance in 1906. They divorced in 1922. She married lawyer James H. Hickey in 1923.

== Bibliography ==
- A maid and a man. Illustrations by Charlotte Weber-Ditzler. New York, Moffat, Yard, 1909.
- Damned: the intimate story of a girl. Macaulay, New York, 1923

with James French Dorrance:

- His Robe of Honor. Moffat Yard & Company,1916.
- Flames of the Blue Ridge. Macaulay, New York, 1919.
- Glory Rides the Range. Macaulay, New York, 1920.
- Get Your Man: A Canadian Mounted Mystery. Macaulay, 1921.
- Lonesome Town. Macaulay, 1922.
- Back of Beyond: An Adventure Story. Chelsea House, New York, 1925.
- The Rim O' The Range. Chelsea House, New York, 1926.
