= Middle of Nowhere =

Middle of Nowhere may refer to:

== Places ==
- A remote or rural location, for example, "the boonies"
- Nutt, New Mexico, which has called itself the Middle of Nowhere
- Glasgow, Montana, referred to by The Washington Post as "the middle of nowhere"

== Books ==
- The Middle of Nowhere, a Dragonlance novel by Paul B. Thompson
- The Middle of Nowhere, a Star Wolf novel by David Gerrold

== Films ==
- Middle of Nowhere (2008 film), a coming-of-age comedy-drama film
- Middle of Nowhere (2012 film), directed by Ava DuVernay

== Music ==
=== Albums ===
- Middle of Nowhere (Hanson album), 1997
- Middle of Nowhere Acoustic, a 2007 live acoustic album and DVD also by Hanson
- Middle of Nowhere (Kacey Musgraves album), 2026
- The Middle of Nowhere (Orbital album), 1999
- The Middle of Nowhere (Circle II Circle album), 2005
- The Middle of Nowhere, a 2000 album by Future Loop Foundation
- In the Middle of Nowhere, a 1986 album by Modern Talking

=== Songs ===
- "In the Middle of Nowhere", a 1965 song by Dusty Springfield
- "Middle of Nowhere" (song), by Hot Hot Heat
- "Middle of Nowhere", a song by Selena Gomez & the Scene from their third album When the Sun Goes Down
- "Middle of Nowhere", a song by The Blank Theory from their 2002 album Beyond the Calm of the Corridor
- "Middle of Nowhere" (Felix Sandman song)
- "Middle of Nowhere" (Stone Temple Pilots song)
