= Ola Nordmann =

National personification of Norwegians

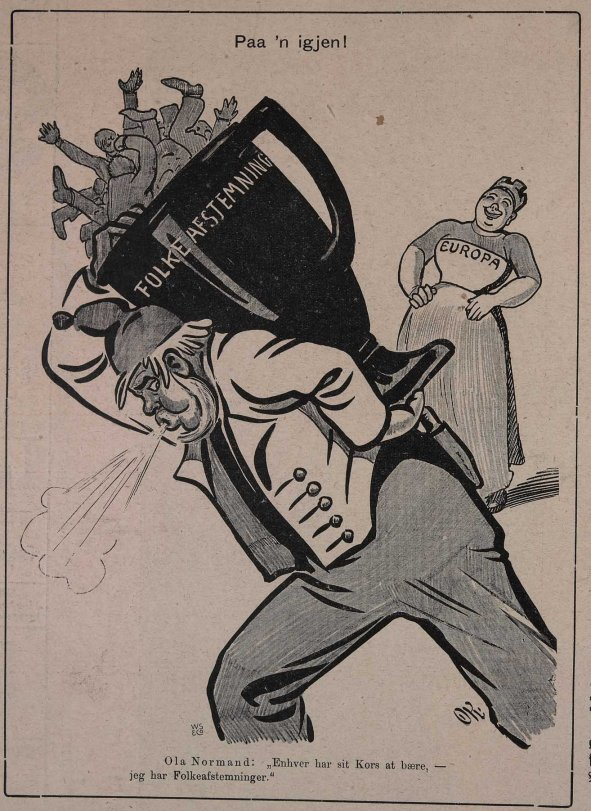
Caricatures of Ola Nordmann are quite common. This is a drawing from 1905 by caricaturist Olaf Krohn illustrating how Ola Nordmann had to carry the burden of two referendums (The 1905 Norwegian union dissolution referendum and Norwegian monarchy plebiscite, 1905, both of which resulted in some of the most lopsided returns of a legitimate election) in one year, while an amused Europa regina is observing from a distance.

Ola Nordmann is a national personification of Norwegians, either for individuals or collectively. It is also used as a placeholder name. The female counterpart is Kari Nordmann, and collectively they are referred to as Ola og Kari Nordmann (Ola and Kari Nordmann).

== Usage of the name Ola Nordmann ==
=== As a national personification ===
The media often uses "Ola Nordmann" to describe trends in the population.

For example: A headline in a newspaper that reads Norwegians consume less milk could just as well read Ola Nordmann drinks less milk.

Caricatures of Ola Nordmann as a national personification of Norway usually depict him as a blond-haired man dressed in bunad-like traditional folk clothing and wearing a woollen red top cap - the traditional headwear of a Norwegian gnome or nisse. This headwear was also worn by the traditional Norwegian farmer, mostly in the old Norwegian farm culture. In the romantic national period, the farmer often came to represent the Norwegian people as a whole, hence the representation.

=== As a placeholder name ===
Ola Nordmann is also used as a default name in examples used to guide people in how to fill in forms etc. (similar to Joe Bloggs in the UK or John Doe in America). In legal examples, Peder Ås is often used as a placeholder name instead.

== Etymology ==
Ola is a common male first name in Norway (derived from Olav/Olaf), and Nordmann is a demonym for a Norwegian, i.e. "Ola Norwegian".

== Kari Nordmann ==
The female equivalent or variant is personified as Kari Nordmann, "Kari and Ola Nordmann" is often used together to describe the archetypal Norwegian family or household.

== See also ==
- Joe Bloggs
- John Bull
- John Doe
- John Q. Public
- Ole and Lena
- Uncle Sam
