= Boondocks =

Remote or unsophisticated area

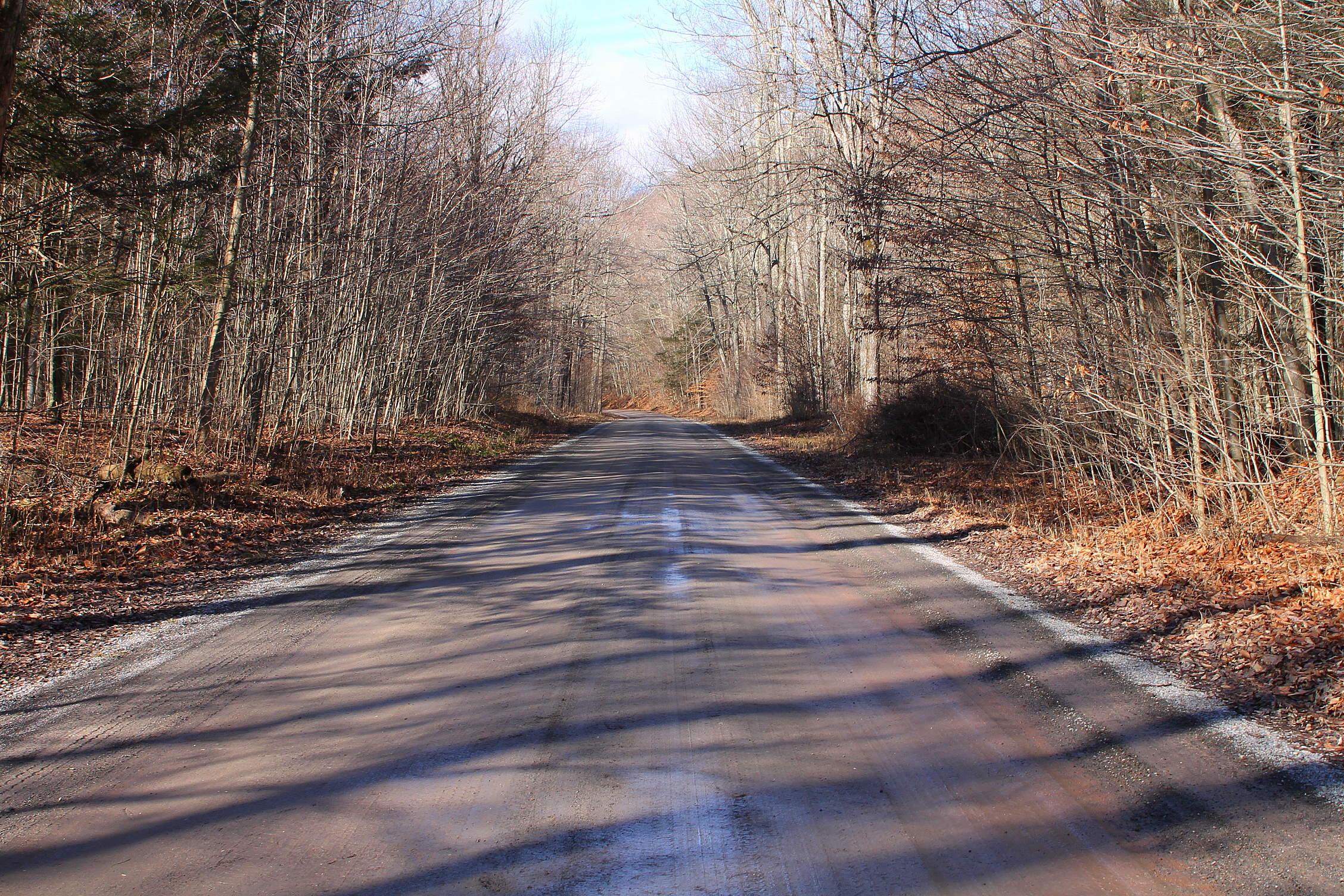
A road in the boondocks of Pennsylvania State Game Lands Number 13, Sullivan County, Pennsylvania

The boondocks is an American expression from the Tagalog (Filipino) word bundók ("mountain"). It originally referred to a remote rural area, but now is often applied to an out-of-the-way location considered backward and unsophisticated by city folk. It can also occasionally refer to a mountain in both Filipino and American contexts.

== Origins ==
The expression was introduced to American English by U.S. military personnel fighting in the Philippine–American War (1899–1902). It derives from the Tagalog word "bundók", (Note: From Proto-Malayo-Polynesian *bunduk ("higher ground"), ultimately from Proto-Austronesian *bunduk ("higher ground")) which means "mountain". According to military historian Paul A. Kramer, the term originally had "connotations of bewilderment and confusion", due to the guerrilla warfare in which the soldiers were engaged.

In the Philippines, the word bundók is also a colloquialism referring to rural inland areas, which are usually mountainous and difficult to access, as most major cities and settlements in the Philippines are located in lowlands or near the coastline. Equivalent terms include the Spanish-derived probinsiya ("province") and the Cebuano term bukid ("mountain"). (Note: From Proto-Austronesian *bukij ("mountain", "forested inland mountain areas")) When used generally, the term refers to a mountainous area with a connotation of being rustic or uncivilized. When referring to people (taga-bundok or probinsiyano in Tagalog; taga-bukid in Cebuano; English: "someone who comes from the mountains/provinces"), it is sometimes used to connote a stereotype of naive or boorish countryside dwellers.

== Expanded meanings ==
The term evolved into American slang to refer to the countryside or isolated rural/wilderness area, regardless of topography or vegetation. Similar slang or colloquial words are "the sticks", "the wops", "the backblocks", or "Woop Woop" in Australia, "the wop-wops" or "the back blocks" in New Zealand, "bundu" in South Africa (unrelated to "boondocks" or "bundok"), "out in the weeds" in New Brunswick and "out in the tules" in California. The diminutive "boonies" can be heard in films about the Vietnam War such as Brian De Palma's Casualties of War (1989) used by American soldiers to designate rural areas of Vietnam.

Boondocking refers to camping with a recreational vehicle (RV) in a remote location without the electricity, water, or sewer infrastructure that is available at campgrounds or RV parks.

== In popular culture ==
- "Down in the Boondocks", a hit song from the 1965 titular album by Billy Joe Royal
- The Boondocks, a 1996 comic strip and the adult animated sitcom adapted from it
- The Boondock Saints, a 1999 American vigilante action thriller film written and directed by Troy Duffy
- "Boondocks", a song by Little Big Town from their 2005 album The Road to Here
- Boondox, the name of a neighboring town in the 2005 video game Animal Crossing: Wild World

== See also ==
- Boonie hat
- Hillbilly
- Hinterland
- Jíbaro
- Middle of nowhere
- Podunk
- Waikikamukau
- Yokel
