= Gilbert model =

Model to classify people in society

The Gilbert model was developed by Dennis Gilbert as a means of a more effective way of classifying people in a given society into social classes. It posits the existence of six distinct classes: a capitalist class, an upper middle class, a lower middle class, a working class, a working-poor class, and an underclass.

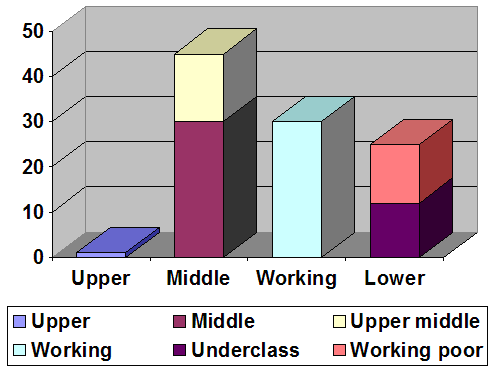
An illustration of the population share of Gilbert's six classes

== Influences ==
Karl Marx believed that social class is determined by ownership (or non-ownership) of the "means of economic production" – ownership of raw materials, farmland, coal mines, factories, etc. His theory contains the idea of a struggle between two social classes – the Bourgeoisie (the capital owners) and the Proletariat (the non-owner workers).

Like Marx, Max Weber agreed that social class is determined mostly based on the unequal distribution of economic power and hence the unequal distribution of opportunity. However, he also saw that honour, status and social prestige were key factors in determining what social class people belong to. According to Weber, "life-styles", such as where a person lives and the schools they attend, are very important in determining social class. "Life-chances" also determined social class. If a person becomes a respectable member of society it will raise their social class. Party affiliations can also influence social class.

== Basis ==
Even though Marx's and Weber's research were both taken into consideration when trying to create an effective means of social stratification, they were not weighted the same. Although the Gilbert model is based on the assumption that class structure develops out of the economic system like the Marxist theory, it still has much more in common with Weber's more modern theory that dealt with socialism. The aspect that Marxism takes into consideration when referring to the economy is "what a specific person owns determines their class" – a capitalistic viewpoint. If a man owns a factory, he is going to be in a higher social class than someone who works in the factory. In Marxist theory, the middle class is not emphasized or described, but it is clearly present in the Gilbert model. The Gilbert model focuses on occupation and, more generally on the source of income (occupation for most, but also assets, and government transfers for people at the top or bottom) and when referring to how the economic system places people in classes. The occupation of a person is directly related to a person's educational preparation because better education provides for a better occupation which in turn raises their class level.

== Six social classes ==
The six social classes that provide the basis for the Gilbert model are determined based on the assumption of how class structure develops out of the economic system. Although the social hierarchy is most obvious at the extremes, differences between classes begin to become blurred when moving away from one of the extremes and towards the centre to where the middle and working classes are. It is difficult to get a precise classification.

=== Capitalist class ===
(Typical income: $1.5 million, mostly from assets) Even though the capitalist class is a very small class of super-rich capitalists at the top of the hierarchy, its impact on the economy and society is far beyond their numbers. These people contribute their money to political parties and are often owners of newspapers or television stations. They have investments that affect millions of people in the labour force. They tend to only associate with other people from their own class, rarely interacting with people from an inferior class. Even their children are usually segregated, attending only the most elite preparatory schools and universities.

=== Upper middle class ===
(typical income $200,000; for Working rich $500,000) The upper middle class is the group in society most shaped by formal education. A college degree is usually required and graduate studies are becoming increasingly required. Most people in this class are technicians, professionals, managers, officials, and highly successful small business owners. At the top of this class is the growing segment of working rich, affluent professionals and business owners. Children in high school strive to prepare themselves for upper-middle-class jobs because these types of jobs are symbols of success. Upper-middle-class people are able to purchase status symbols such as spacious homes. They are convinced that they deserve what they have achieved and are mostly satisfied that they have achieved a proper share of the American Dream.

=== Lower middle class ===
(Typical income $85,000) To attain a middle-class job it takes at least a high school diploma. However, many in the middle class have received some form of additional post-secondary training. The most educated will become semi-professionals, or have low-level managerial jobs. Sales and craft people are also included in this social class. Gilbert estimates that about a third of the population is middle class.

=== Working class ===
(Typical income $40,000) The core of this working class is made up of semi-skilled machine operators. Clerks and salespeople whose tasks are habitual and mechanized and require practically no skill beyond literacy. Brief on-the-job training can also be considered to be a part of this class. It is estimated that this class includes roughly a third of the population.

=== Working-poor class ===
(Typical Income: $25,000) The working poor class includes unskilled labourers, people in service jobs, and lower-paid factory workers. Income depends on the number of workers in the family and the number of weeks that they work. Many have not finished high school. Unable to save money and when retired the working poor depend heavily on their social security pensions to live.

=== Underclass ===
(Typical Income $15,000) These people are under-employed. They suffer from low education, low employability, and/or low income. Some can not work because of their age or disability. Hard times might be magnified because they belong to a minority group who suffers discrimination in the workforce.

== See also ==
- Social stratification
