= Woop Woop =

Australian term

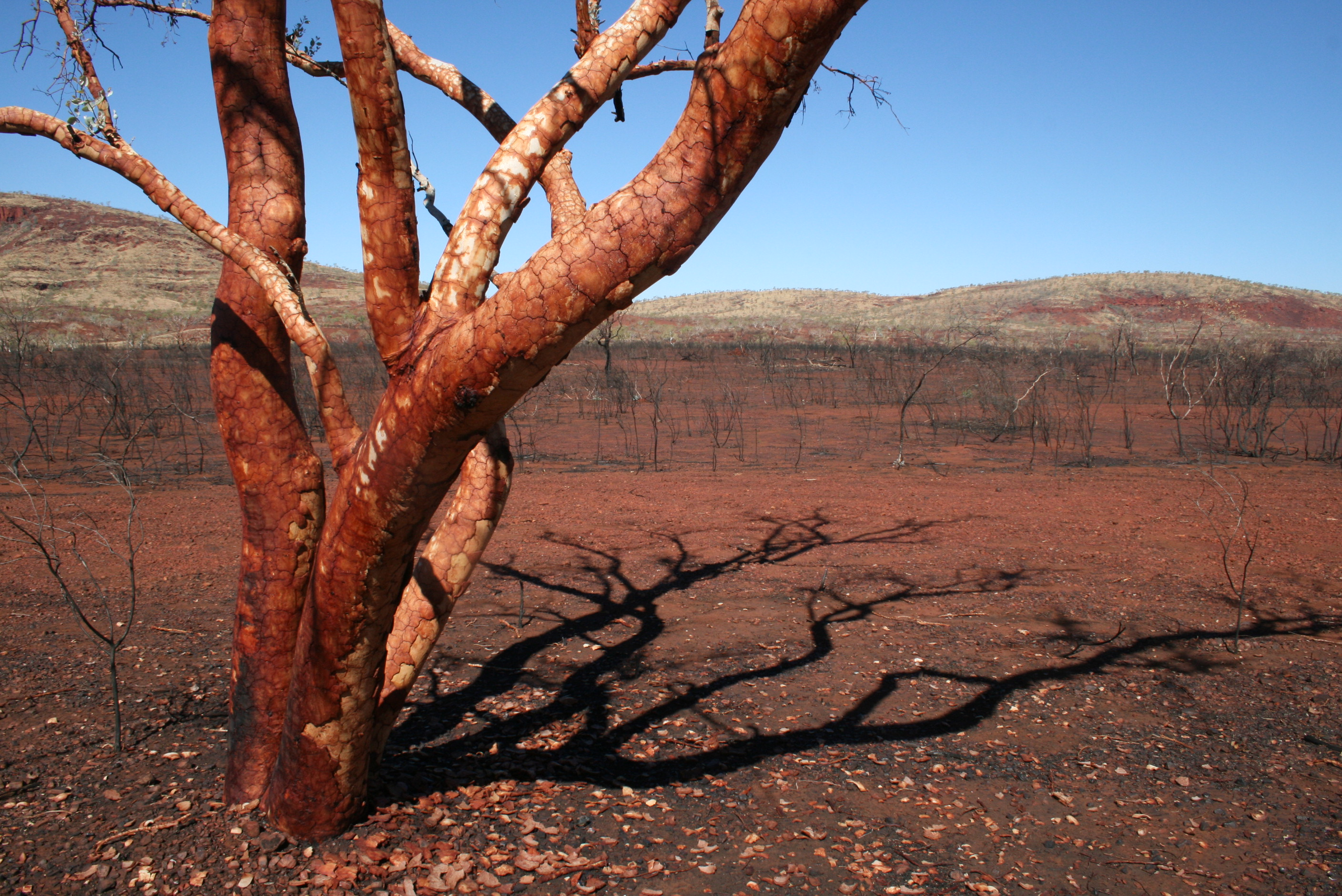
A possible "woop woop" area, located in the outback

Woop Woop (wop-wops in New Zealand) is an Australian term meaning a place that is a far distance from anything. Equivalent terms include "the middle of nowhere", "the boondocks" (Southern United States), "out in the boonies" (Western Canada), and "out in the sticks" or "the back of beyond" (UK). The term could be used pejoratively.

In a 2024 survey, 52% of newcomers to Australia reported knowing the term.

== Etymology ==
Woop woop was first used in the 1890s, along with other terms for imaginary place names like "Oodnagalahbi", to describe a mythical outback town.

The term is said to have been derived from the nickname given to men who carried fleeces in shearing sheds, after the sound they made as they ran around. Another theory indicates that the repetition is inspired by First Nations languages that often use reduplication for emphasis or plurality.

== Usage ==
Welcome to Woop Woop is a 1997 Australian comedy film about an American tourist who is kidnapped and brought to a cult named "Woop woop" located in the outback.

In 2021, the term was also used in a book about The Ghan train, titled The Train to Oodna-woop-woop: The story of The Ghan.

Whoop Whoop is the name of an Antarctic field camp on the ice plateau 40 kilometres (25 mi) east of Davis Station, used as a ski landing area (SLA) in late summer when the early summer sea ice SLAs adjacent to Davis are unusable.

== Related Australian terms ==
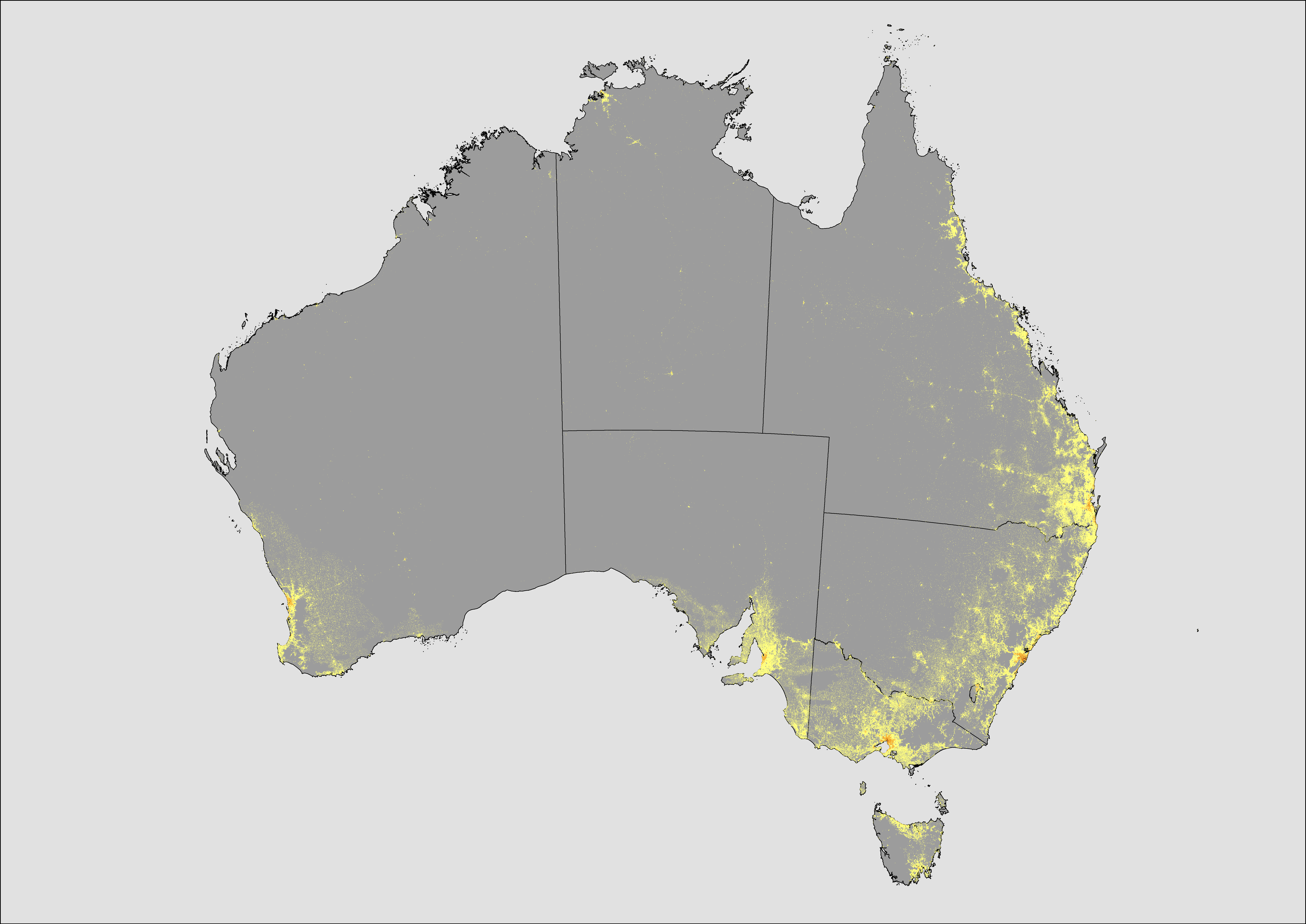
Population density of Australia, where yellow indicates more people

Australia is mostly populated in its urban coastal regions. The outback is the most common term to refer to the vast inland region, which has held a fascination in popular Australian culture.

- "Grubba Grubba" is another version commonly found outback in the Kimberley. It was also the name of a sawmill near the town of Wilga in the south-west of Western Australia that was abandoned in 1984.
- "Beyond the black stump" is the outback, but something "this side of the black stump" belongs to the known world.
- "Dingo woop woop"

== See also ==
- Outback
- The bush
- Welcome to Woop Woop
