= Dennis Gilbert (sociologist) =

American sociologist (born 1943)

Dennis L. Gilbert (born October 7, 1943, in Bremerton, Washington) is a professor emeritus and former chair of sociology at Hamilton College in Clinton, New York. He holds a Doctor of Philosophy degree from Cornell University and has taught at the Universidad Católica in Lima, Peru, Cornell University, and joined Hamilton college in 1976. He has published a variety of sociology books, mainly dealing with socio-economic stratification.

Gilbert wrote a series of books entitled The American Class Structure. His work addresses Latin America, social stratification, polling, and more specifically the American class structure. He developed the Gilbert model, a way of classifying people into social classes.

== List of publications ==
Since 1981, Dennis Gilbert has published the following books according to Amazon.com:

- Mexico's Middle Class in the Neoliberal Era, 2007, ISBN 0816525900
- The American Class Structure in an Age of Growing Inequality: multiple editions including 2018 (10th), ISBN 1506345964, 2010 (8th), ISBN 141297965X, 2002 (6th), ISBN 0534541100, and 1998 (5th).
- The American Class Structure: A New Synthesis, 1992
- Sandinistas: The Party and the Revolution, 1990, ISBN 1557860068

== See also ==
- Gilbert model
