= Social class in the United States =

Grouping Americans by some measure of social status

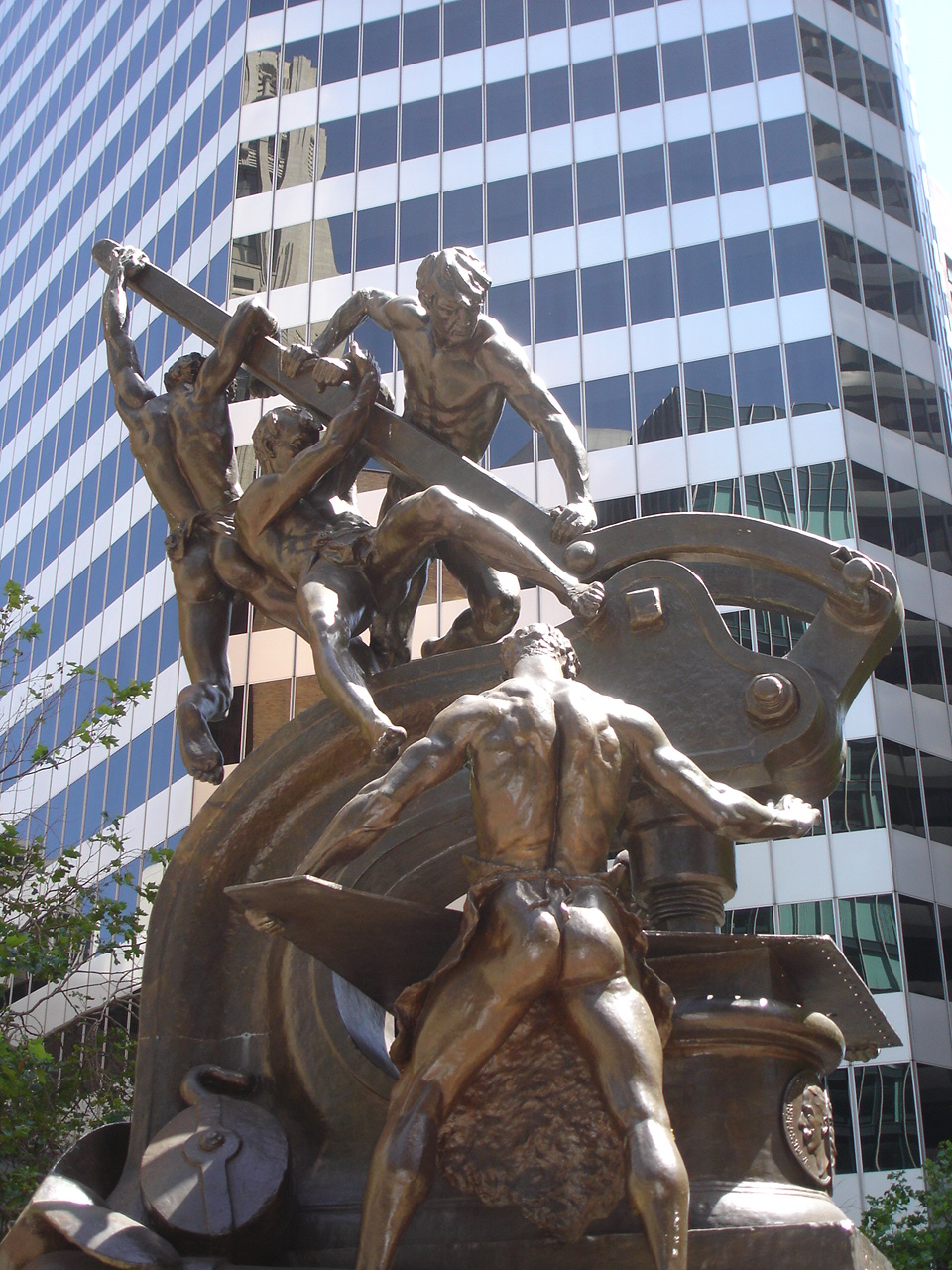
Douglas Tilden's monument to the working and supporting classes along Market Street in the heart of San Francisco's Financial District

Social class in the United States refers to the idea of grouping Americans by some measure of social status, typically by economic status. However, it could also refer to social status and/or location. There are many competing class systems and models.

Many Americans believe in a social class system that has three different groups or classes: the American rich (upper class), the American middle class, and the American poor. More complex models propose as many as a dozen class levels, including levels such as high upper class, upper class, upper middle class, middle class, lower middle class, working class, and lower class, while others disagree with the American construct of social class completely. Most definitions of a class structure group its members according to wealth, income, education, type of occupation, and membership within a hierarchy, specific subculture, or social network. Most concepts of American social class do not focus on race or ethnicity as a characteristic within the stratification system, although these factors are closely related.

Sociologists Dennis Gilbert, William Thompson, Joseph Hickey, and James Henslin have proposed class systems with six distinct social classes. These class models feature an upper or capitalist class consisting of the rich and powerful, an upper middle class consisting of highly educated and affluent professionals, a middle class consisting of college-educated individuals employed in white-collar industries, a lower middle class composed of semi-professionals with typically some college education, a working class constituted by clerical and blue collar workers, whose work is highly routinized, and a lower class, divided between the working poor and the unemployed underclass.

== Markers ==
Though the 10th percentile of American households have zero net worth, the 90th percentile has $1.8 million of household wealth.

The median wealth of married couples exceeds that of single individuals, regardless of gender and across all age categories.

Income and wealth, by educational level (US)

Median annual salaries across educational levels varied by a factor of about 3.

Median accumulated household wealth across educational levels varied by a factor of over 50.

Some definitions of class look only at numerical measures, such as wealth or income. Others take into account qualitative factors, such as education, culture, and social status. There is no consensus on which of these variables is essential and which are merely common correlates.

Social class is sometimes presented as a description of how members of the society have sorted themselves along a continuum of positions varying in importance, influence, prestige, and compensation. It is disputed whether sharp lines can be drawn for social classes. One point of view in the debate is:

A stratified society is one marked by inequality, by differences among people that are regarded as being higher or lower…it is logically possible for a society to be stratified in a continuous gradation between high and low without any sharp lines…in reality…there is only a limited number of types of occupations…People in similar positions…grow similar in their thinking and lifestyle…they form a pattern, and this pattern creates social class.

— Dennis Gilbert, The American Class Structure, 1998

=== Social status ===
It is impossible to understand people's behavior…without the concept of social stratification, because class position has a pervasive influence on almost everything…the clothes we wear…the television shows we watch…the colors we paint our homes in and the names we give our pets…Our position in the social hierarchy affects our health, happiness, and even how long we will live.

— William Thompson and Joseph Hickey, Society in Focus, 2005

In some models, certain occupations are considered to be desirable and influential, while others are considered to be menial, repetitive, and unpleasant. (In some cases, non-occupational roles such as a parent or volunteer mentor, are also considered.) Generally, the higher the ranking on such a scale, the higher the skill and education levels required to perform it.

Some sociologists consider the higher income and prestige of higher ranked jobs to simply be incentives to encourage members of society to obtain the skills necessary to perform important work. This is an important mechanism in the economic theory of capitalism and is compatible with the notion that class is mutable and determined by a combination of choices and opportunities.

In other cases, class or status is inherited. For example, being the son or daughter of a wealthy individual, may carry a higher status and different cultural connotations than being a member of nouveau riche ("new money") or have a planned path of positive freedom. Those taking the functionalist approach to sociology and economics view social classes as components essential for the survival of complex societies, such as American society.

Assortative mating in humans has been widely observed and studied. It includes the tendency of humans to prefer to mate within their socio-economic peers, that is, those with similar social standing, job prestige, educational attainment, or economic background as they themselves. This tendency has always been present in society: there was no historical area when most of the individuals preferred to sort, and had actually sorted, negatively into couples or matched, randomly, along these traits. This trend is evidenced by the search criteria of online dating site users.

A 2022 study suggested that factors that contribute to low levels of intergenerational mobility in the United States include a disparity in returns to human capital, low levels of public investment in the human capital of low-income children, high levels of socioeconomic residential segregation, and low levels of progressiveness in the tax-and-transfer system.

=== Income ===
Median household income by selected characteristics
| Type of household | | | Race and Hispanic origin | | | | Region | | | |
| All households | Family households | Nonfamily households | Asian | Non-Hispanic White | Hispanic (of any race) | Black | Northeast | Midwest | South | West |
|---|---|---|---|---|---|---|---|---|---|---|
| $70,784 | $91,162 | $41,797 | $101,418 | $77,999 | $57,981 | $48,297 | $77,422 | $71,129 | $63,368 | $79,430 |

Median household income by selected characteristics cont.
| Age of Householder | | Nativity of Householder | | Metropolitan Statistical Area (MSA) Status | | Educational Attainment of Householder* | | | |
| Under 65 years | 65 years and older | Native-born | Foreign-born | Inside MSA | Outside MSA | No high school diploma | High school, no college | Some college | Bachelor's degree or higher |
|---|---|---|---|---|---|---|---|---|---|
| $80,734 | $47,620 | $71,522 | $66,043 | $73,823 | $53,750 | $30,378 | $50,401 | $64,378 | $115,456 |
*Householders aged 25 and older. In 2021, the median household income for this group was $72,046.

Median earnings by work status and sex (Persons, aged 15 years and older with earnings)
| Total workers | | | Full-Time, year-round workers | | |
| Both sexes | Male | Female | Both sexes | Male | Female |
|---|---|---|---|---|---|
| $45,470 | $50,983 | $39,201 | $56,473 | $61,180 | $51,226 |

2020 Median earnings & household income by educational attainment
| Measure | Overall | Less than 9th grade | Some High School | High school graduate | Some college | Associate's degree | Bachelor's degree or higher | Bachelor's degree | Master's degree | Professional degree | Doctorate degree |
|---|---|---|---|---|---|---|---|---|---|---|---|
| Persons, age 25+ w/ earnings* | $46,985 | $25,162 | $26,092 | $34,540 | $39,362 | $42,391 | $66,423 | $60,705 | $71,851 | $102,741 | $101,526 |
| Male, age 25+ w/ earnings* | $52,298 | $30,089 | $31,097 | $40,852 | $47,706 | $52,450 | $80,192 | $71,666 | $91,141 | $126,584 | $121,956 |
| Female, age 25+ w/ earnings* | $40,392 | $18,588 | $19,504 | $27,320 | $31,837 | $36,298 | $57,355 | $51,154 | $62,522 | $92,780 | $85,551 |
| Persons, age 25+, employed full-time | $59,371 | $33,945 | $34,897 | $42,417 | $50,640 | $52,285 | $77,105 | $71,283 | $82,183 | $130,466 | $119,552 |
| Household | $69,228 | $29,609 | $29,520 | $47,405 | $60,392 | $68,769 | $106,936 | $100,128 | $114,900 | $151,560 | $142,493 |
*Total work experience

Household income distribution
| 10th percentile | 20th percentile | 30th percentile | 40th percentile | 50th percentile | 60th percentile | 70th percentile | 80th percentile | 90th percentile | 95th percentile |
|---|---|---|---|---|---|---|---|---|---|
| ≤ $15,700 | ≤ $28,000 | ≤ $40,500 | ≤ $55,000 | $70,800 | ≤ $89,700 | ≤ $113,200 | ≤ $149,100 | ≤ $212,100 | ≤ $286,300 |
Source: US Census Bureau, 2021; income statistics for the year 2021

Income in the United States is most commonly measured by United States Census Bureau in terms of either household or individual and remains one of the most prominent indicators of class status. As 82% of all households, 16% of those in the top quintiles, had two income earners the discrepancy between household and personal income is quite considerable. while the median personal income (including only those above the age of 25) was $32,140.

Per capita household income, the income a household is able to allocate to each member of the household is also an important variable in determining a given household's standard of living. A high household income may be offset by a large household size; thus, resulting in a low per capita household income.

It should be stressed...that a position does not bring power and prestige because it draws a high income. Rather, it draws a high income because it is functionally important and the available personnel are for one reason or another scarce. It is therefore superficial and erroneous to regard high income as the cause of a man's power and prestige, just as it is erroneous to think that a man's fever is the cause of his disease...The economic source of power and prestige is not income primarily, but the ownership of capital goods (including patents, good will, and professional reputation). Such ownership should be distinguished from the possession of consumers' goods, which is an index rather than a cause of social standing.

— Kingsley Davis and Wilbert E. Moore, Some Principles of Stratification, 1945

In the passage above, Davis and Moore argue that income is one of the most prominent features of social class; it is not one of its causes. In other words, income does not determine the status of an individual or household but rather reflects on that status. Some say that income and prestige are the incentives provided by society in order to fill needed positions with the most qualified and motivated personnel possible.

The New York Times has used income quintiles to define class. It has assigned the quintiles from lowest to highest as lower class, lower middle class, middle class, upper middle class, and upper class. These definitions equate class with income, permitting people to move from class to class as their income changes.

==== Dual income controversy ====
Percentage of 2+ income households in each of the quintiles (1/5 of the population)

Income is one of the most commonly used attributes of a household to determine its class status. The relationship between income, which mostly arises from the scarcity of a certain skill, may however, prove to be more complex than initially perceived. While the idea is that income reflects status, household income may just be the product of two or more incomes.

In 2005, 42% of American households had two or more income earners. The vast majority (77%) of households in the top quintile had two or more income earners. This means that the majority of household income in the top quintile are the result of two income earners pooling their resources, establishing a close link between perceived affluence and the number of income earners in a given household. This raises the question of whether or not the combination of incomes results in higher social status. Of course, there is no definite answer as class is a vague sociological concept.

The parade of income earners with height representing income suggest that the relationship between the distribution of income and the class structure is...blurred in the middle...we saw dual-income working class marchers looking down on single-income upper-middle class marchers. In sum, the class structure as we have defined it...does not exactly match the distribution of household income.

— Dennis Gilbert, The American Class Structure, 1998

Sociologist Dennis Gilbert states that it is possible for households to out-earn other households over higher class standing through increasing their number of income earners. He furthermore states that household size also played an essential role, as the standard of living for two persons living off one upper middle class personal income may very well be higher than that of a household with four members living off two working class personal incomes.

The combination of two or more incomes allows for households to increase their income substantially without moving higher on the occupational ladder or attaining higher educational degrees. The favorable economic position of households in the top two quintiles is in some cases the result of combined income, rather than demand for a single worker.

=== Education ===
Higher educational attainment in the US corresponds with median household wealth.

Tertiary education (or "higher education") is required for many middle-class professions, depending on how the term middle class is to be defined. Tertiary education is rarely free, but the costs vary, widely. Tuition at elite private colleges often exceeds $200,000 for a four-year program, although financial aid may be significant. On the other hand, public colleges and universities typically charge much less, particularly for state residents.

Also, scholarships offered by universities and government do exist, and low-interest loans are available. Still, the average cost of education, by all accounts, is increasing. The attainment of post-secondary and graduate degrees is, perhaps, the most important feature of a middle and upper middle class person, with the university being regarded as the most essential institution and gatekeeper of the professional middle class. Educational attainment is also directly linked to income.

Per the table below in this section, as of 2018 less than 40% of American adults over the age of 25 had a Bachelor's degree or higher. Although 90% of the population has graduated from high school, the average American does not have a college degree but has likely attended college for some time. Overall, educational attainment serves as an essential class feature of most Americans, being directly linked to income and occupation.

According to a 2024 Pew Research Center study, 47% of women and 37% men aged 25-34 had at least a bachelor's degree. In 2025, Axios reported that “The class divide among women in the workplace is widening.” It said that college-educated women triumphed in the work force in recent years. For women without a degree, the story was less rosy.

Educational attainment in the United States (2018)
| Education | Age 25 and over | Age 25-30 |
|---|---|---|
| High school diploma or GED | 89.80% | 92.95% |
| Some college | 61.28% | 66.34% |
| Associate degree | 45.16% | 46.72% |
| Bachelor's degree | 34.98% | 36.98% |
| Master's degree | 13.04% | 9.01% |
| Professional degree | 3.47% | 2.02% |
| Doctorate | 2.03% | 1.12% |

== Culture ==
Social connectedness to people of higher income levels is a strong predictor of upward income mobility. However, data shows substantial social segregation correlating with economic income groups.

Broadly speaking, the United States aspires to be an egalitarian country with social mobility; the American Dream includes the idea from the Declaration of Independence that "all men are created equal" and have the "unalienable right" to "Life, Liberty and the pursuit of Happiness". The phrase "second-class citizen" has a strong negative connotation in national politics.

In practice, socioeconomic mobility in the United States is relatively low, compared to Nordic countries and Canada, and income inequality in the United States is relatively high. Educational attainment and income are strongly correlated, but relatively low funding for K-12 schools in poor neighborhoods raises concerns about a cycle of poverty. These apparent contradictions lead to divergent views on whether American society is divided into distinct classes or should be analyzed that way.

According to a 2021 study, in the United States, 50% of a father's income position is inherited by his son. In contrast, the amount in Norway and Canada is less than 20%. Moreover, in the U.S. 8% of children raised in the bottom 20% of the income distribution are able to climb to the top 20% as adults, while the figure in Denmark is nearly double at 15%. According to an academic study on why Americans overestimate class mobility, "research indicates that errors in social perception are driven by both informational factors—such as the lack of awareness of statistical information relevant to actual mobility trends—and motivational factors—the desire to believe that society is meritocratic." Americans are more inclined to believe in meritocracy out of the prospect that they will one day join the elite or upper class. Scholars have paralleled this belief to John Steinbeck's notable quote that "the poor see themselves not as an exploited proletariat but as temporarily embarrassed millionaires.”

Explanations for the relatively low level of social mobility in the US include: the better access of affluent children to superior schools and preparation for schools, which is important in an economy where pay is tilted toward educated workers; high levels of immigration of unskilled laborers and low rate of unionization, which leads to lower wages among the least skilled; public health problems, such as obesity and diabetes, which can limit education and employment; the sheer size of the income gap between the rich which makes it harder to climb the proverbial income ladder when the rungs are farther apart; and poverty, since those with low income have significantly lower rates of mobility than middle and higher income individuals.

=== Studies ===
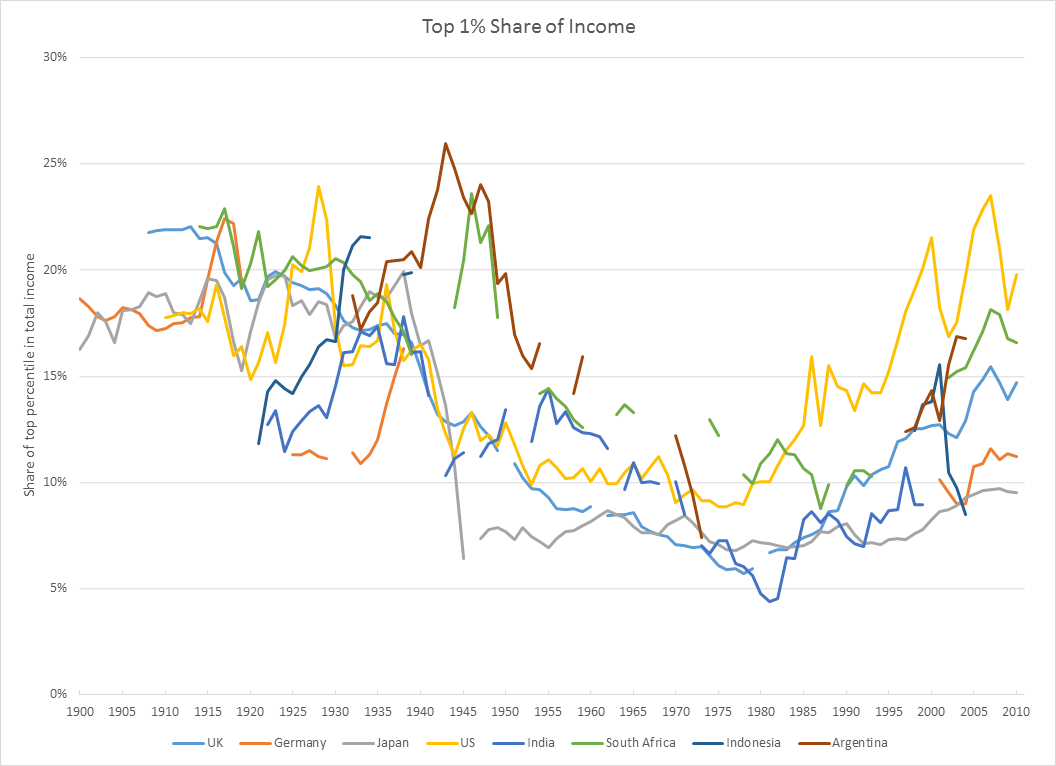
Income inequality as measured by the income of the top 1% in several countries. Inequality tended to drop in the middle of the 20th century but has increased in the past several decades.

In 2012, Charles Murray described what he saw as the economic divide and social bifurcation of Americans that has occurred since 1960 in his book, Coming Apart: The State of White America, 1960–2010. Murray described diverging trends between upper and lower class white Americans in the half century, after the death of John F. Kennedy. He focused on white Americans to argue that economic decline in that period was not experienced solely by minorities, whom he brings into his argument in the last few chapters of the book. He argued that class strain had cleaved white Americans into two distinct, highly segregated strata: "an upper class, defined by educational attainment, and a new lower class, characterized by the lack of it." Much of his argument is centered on a notion of self-selective sorting that began in the 1960s and 1970s, when people overwhelmingly began marrying and living in areas surrounded largely by people of similar socioeconomic characteristics, leading to not only an exacerbation of existing economic divides, but an unprecedented socio-cultural divide that had not existed before in America.

French economist Thomas Piketty specializes in economic inequality by taking a historic and statistical approach. Piketty's 2019 book Capital and Ideology argues that inequality is a social phenomenon, driven by human institutions. Institutional change, in turn, reflects the ideology that dominates society: "Inequality is neither economic nor technological; it is ideological and political." In one example, Piketty highlights how during the Belle Époque (1871-1914) in the French Third Republic, economic inequality was just as high as during the Ancien régime before the French Revolution, despite the monarchy being abolished and France industrializing. It was only after the world wars that France adopted a welfare state.

In 2019, Daniel Markovits published the book The Meritocracy Trap, in which he argued that meritocracy was the center of rising economic inequality and social and political dysfunction. Markovits argued that "meritocracy excludes people outside of the elite, excludes middle class people and working class people from schooling, from good jobs, and from status and income, and then insults them by saying that the reason they’re excluded is that they don’t measure up, rather than that there’s a structural block to their inclusion." Furthermore, Markovits explicitly denounces the myth of the purported "American meritocracy", which for him "has become precisely what it was invented to combat: a mechanism for the dynastic transmission of wealth and privilege across generations." The minority of individuals who manage to overcome structural conditions and achieve upward class mobility are used as examples to support the idea that meritocracy exists, which is an example of survival bias.

=== Social norms ===
Once defined, social classes can be considered to feature their own sub-cultures, including different ways of socializing children. Social classes form social groups so large that they feature considerable diversity within and any statement regarding a given social class' culture needs to be seen as a broad generalization. Parental views are, perhaps, the most essential factor in determining the socialization process which shapes new members of society. The values and standards used in child rearing are commonly closely related to the parent's occupational status.

The strongest cultural differences seem to run along the professional middle class-working class divide. A recent increase in residential class segregation and the overall tendency of individual to associate mostly with those of equal standing as themselves has further strengthened class differences.

Parents from the professional class tend to raise their children to become curious, independent thinkers, while working-class parents raise their children to have a more communal perspective, with a strong respect for authority. Middle-class parents tend to emphasize internal standards and values, while working-class parents emphasize external values.

Sociologist Dennis Gilbert uses a list of values identified by Melvin Kohn to be typical of the professional middle and working class. Middle-class parents' values for their children and themselves included: "Consideration of Others, Self-Control, Curiosity, Happiness, Honesty, Tolerance of Nonconformity, Open to Innovation, Self-Direction." This contrasted with surveyed working class individuals, who reported: "Manners, Obedience, Neatness, Cleanliness, Strong Punishment of Deviant Behavior, Stock to Old Ways, People not Trustworthy, Strict Leadership" as values for themselves and their children. There is a strong correlation between these values and the occupational activities of the respondents. The job characteristics of middle class respondents included: "Work Independently, Varied Tasks, Work with People or Data," versus working-class parents of reported "Close Supervision and Repetitive Work."

Not once in a professional middle-class home did I see a young boy shake his father's hand in a well-taught manly gesture...Not once did I hear a middle-class parent scornfully-or even sympathetically-call a crying boy a sissy or in any way reprimand him for his tears...even as young as six or seven, the working-class boys seemed more emotionally controlled-more like miniature men-than those in the middle-class families.

— Lillian Rubin, Worlds of Pain, 1976

Gender roles are also viewed differently by those in the higher and lower social classes. Middle class individuals, who were more open towards "nonconformity" and emphasized individual self-direction as well as critical thinking, were also less stringent in their application of gender roles. Working class individuals, on the other hand, emphasized gender roles. While working-class people have more and more assimilated to middle class culture regarding their view and application of gender roles, differences remain. Professional class people are more likely to have an egalitarian distribution of work in their household with both spouses being equals in heterosexual marriages. According to Dennis Gilbert, "College life, generally a prologue to upper-middle class careers, delays marriage and encourages informal, relatively egalitarian association between men and women."

== Academic models ==
In a 2018 Gallup poll, 2% of Americans self-identified as upper class, 16% as upper-middle class, 43% as middle class, 30% as working class, and 9% as lower class. According to The Wall Street Journal, the top 10% of earners were responsible for half of all spending in 2025.

=== Gilbert model (2018) ===
The six social classes that provide the basis for the Gilbert model are determined based on the assumption of how class structure develops out of the economic system. They are delineated by household income, and characterized by factors such as workplace autonomy and educational attainment. Although the social hierarchy is most obvious at the extremes, the differences between classes begin to become blurred when moving away from one of the extremes and towards the centre to where the lower middle and working classes are. Gilbert instead argues that the cleavage of the top two "privileged classes" from the bottom four classes is the most important division.

==== Capitalist class (Top 1%) ====
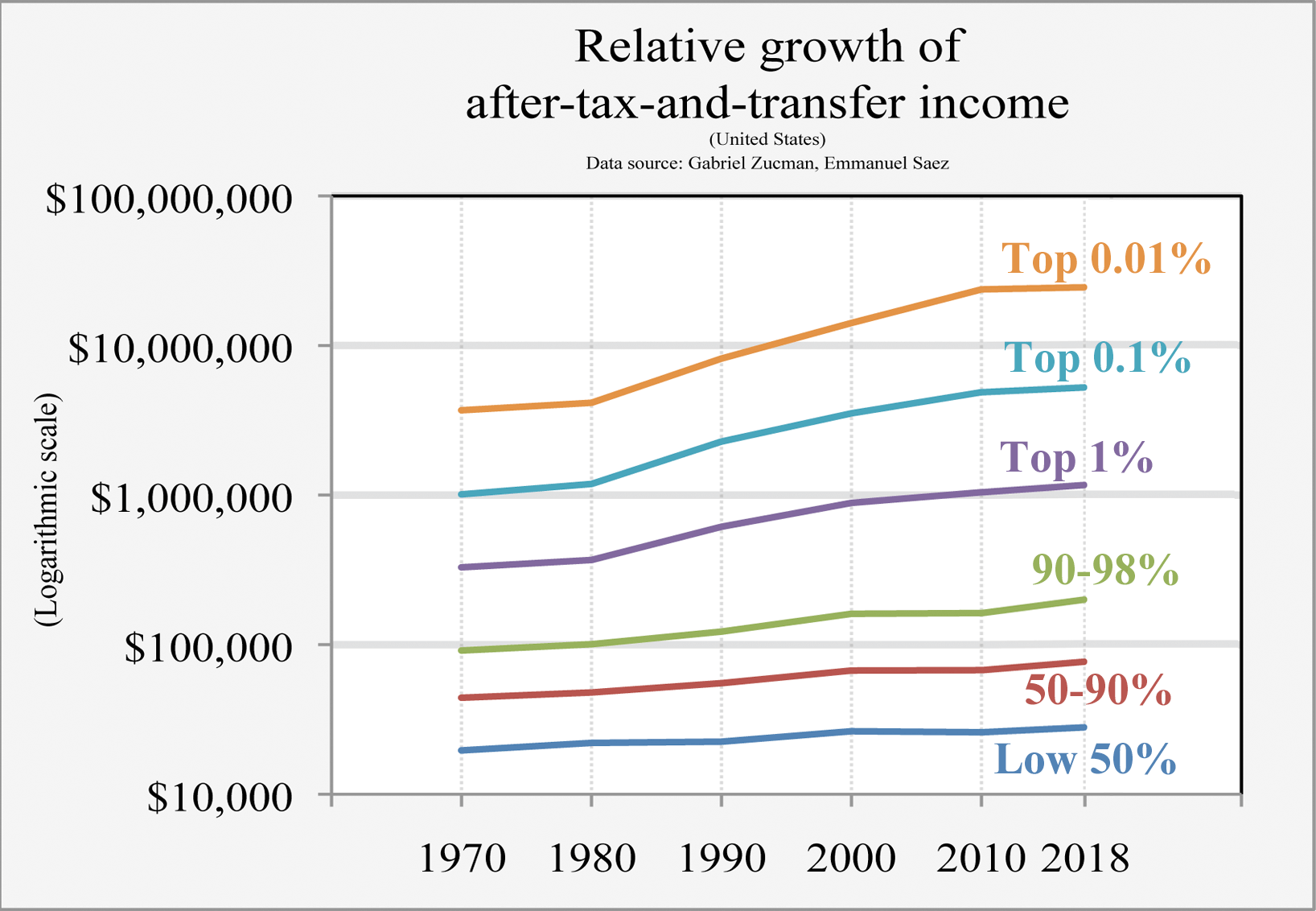
Income inequality, by percentile class, logarithmic scale

(Typical income: $1.5 million, mostly from assets) These include heirs, top executives of large corporations, and owners of large, privately held companies. They primarily earn income from assets that they directly control, such as by being on the board of directors of their businesses.

Even though the capitalist class is a very small class of super-rich capitalists at the top of the hierarchy, its impact on the economy and society is far beyond their numbers. These people contribute their money to political parties and are often owners of newspapers or television stations. They have investments that affect millions of people in the labour force. They tend to only associate with other people from their own class, rarely interacting with people with below-average incomes. Even their children are usually segregated, attending only the most elite preparatory schools and universities.

==== Upper middle class (Next 14%) ====
Higher educational attainment in the US corresponds with median household wealth.

(Typical income $200,000; for Working rich $500,000) Gilbert describes the growing segment of the "working rich" as still part of the upper middle class, consisting of affluent professionals (i.e. law and medicine) and highly successful small business owners. These are the next 14%, and are not considered part of the capitalist class because they still primarily earn income from employment in their jobs, or partnership and self-employment in their businesses, not asset ownership.

The upper middle class is the group in society most shaped by higher education. A bachelor's degree is usually required, and graduate studies and professional degrees are becoming increasingly required. People in this class include professionals, managers, officials, and small business owners. Children in high school strive to prepare themselves for upper-middle-class jobs because these types of jobs are symbols of success. Upper-middle-class people are able to purchase status symbols such as spacious homes. They are convinced that they deserve what they have achieved and are mostly satisfied that they have achieved a proper share of the American dream.

The upper middle class has grown... and its composition has changed. Increasingly salaried managers and professionals have replaced individual business owners and independent professionals. The key to the success of the upper-middle-class is the growing importance of educational certification... its lifestyles and opinions are becoming increasingly normative for the whole society. It is in fact a porous class, open to people... who earn the right credentials.

— Dennis Gilbert, The American Class Structure, 1998.

==== Lower middle class (Next 30%) ====
(Typical income $85,000) Almost all in the middle class have attended an institute of tertiary education, though some didn't graduate with degrees. The most educated will become semi-professionals (i.e. teachers), or have low-level managerial jobs. Skilled technicians and tradespeople are also included in this social class. Their jobs require significant skill, are somewhat supervised, and are fairly well paid. Gilbert estimates that about a third of the population is lower middle class.

==== Working class (Next 25%) ====
(Typical income $40,000) The core of the working class is made up of semi-skilled machine operators, low-paid craftsmen, clerical workers, and retail salespeople. These include both blue-collar and pink-collar jobs. A high school diploma is usually required, and some attended but did not graduate from college. Their tasks are habitual and mechanized, with brief on-the-job training, and are closely supervised. It is estimated that this class includes roughly one-fourth of the population.

==== Working-poor class (Next 15%) ====
(Typical Income: $25,000) The working poor class includes unskilled labourers, many pink-collar jobs, and lower-paid factory workers. Income depends on the number of workers in the family and the number of weeks that they work. Some have not finished high school. Unable to save money and when retired the working poor depend heavily on their social security pensions to live.

==== Underclass (Bottom 15%) ====
(Typical Income $15,000) These people are under-employed. They suffer from low education, low employability, and/or low income. Some can not work because of their age or disability. Hard times might be magnified because they belong to a minority group who suffers discrimination in the workforce.

=== Older models (2000s) ===
The following are reported income-, education-, and occupation-based terms for specific classes commonly used by sociologists. Note that income levels are from the 2000s, and not adjusted for inflation.

Academic class models
| Dennis Gilbert, 2002 | | William Thompson & Joseph Hickey, 2005 | | Leonard Beeghley, 2004 | |
| Class | Typical characteristics | Class | Typical characteristics | Class | Typical characteristics |
|---|---|---|---|---|---|
| Capitalist class (1%) | Top-level executives, high-rung politicians, heirs. Ivy League education common. | Upper class (1%) | Top-level executives, celebrities, heirs; income of $500,000+ common. Ivy League education common. | The super-rich (0.9%) | Multi-millionaires whose incomes commonly exceed $3.5 million or more; includes celebrities and powerful executives/politicians. Ivy League education common. |
| Upper middle class^{[1]} (15%) | Highly-educated (often with graduate degrees), most commonly salaried, professionals and middle management with large work autonomy. | Upper middle class^{[1]} (15%) | Highly-educated (often with graduate degrees) professionals & managers with household incomes varying from the high 5-figure range to commonly above $100,000. | The rich (5%) | Households with net worth of $1 million or more; largely in the form of home equity. Generally have college degrees. |
| Upper middle class^{[1]} (15%) | Highly-educated (often with graduate degrees), most commonly salaried, professionals and middle management with large work autonomy. | Upper middle class^{[1]} (15%) | Highly-educated (often with graduate degrees) professionals & managers with household incomes varying from the high 5-figure range to commonly above $100,000. | Middle class (plurality/ majority?; ca. 46%) | College-educated workers with considerably higher-than-average incomes and compensation; a man making $57,000 and a woman making $40,000 may be typical. |
| Lower middle class (30%) | Semi-professionals and craftsmen with a roughly average standard of living. Most have some college education and are white-collar. | Lower middle class (32%) | Semi-professionals and craftsmen with some work autonomy; household incomes commonly range from $35,000 to $75,000. Typically, some college education. | Middle class (plurality/ majority?; ca. 46%) | College-educated workers with considerably higher-than-average incomes and compensation; a man making $57,000 and a woman making $40,000 may be typical. |
| Working class (30%) | Clerical and most blue-collar workers whose work is highly routinized. Standard of living varies depending on number of income earners, but is commonly just adequate. High school education. | Lower middle class (32%) | Semi-professionals and craftsmen with some work autonomy; household incomes commonly range from $35,000 to $75,000. Typically, some college education. | Middle class (plurality/ majority?; ca. 46%) | College-educated workers with considerably higher-than-average incomes and compensation; a man making $57,000 and a woman making $40,000 may be typical. |
| Working class (30%) | Clerical and most blue-collar workers whose work is highly routinized. Standard of living varies depending on number of income earners, but is commonly just adequate. High school education. | Working class (32%) | Clerical, pink- and blue-collar workers with often low job security; common household incomes range from $16,000 to $30,000. High school education. | Working class (ca. 40–45%) | Blue-collar workers and those whose jobs are highly routinized with low economic security; a man making $40,000 and a woman making $26,000 may be typical. High school education. |
| Working poor (13%) | Service, low-rung clerical and some blue-collar workers. High economic insecurity and risk of poverty. Some high school education. | Working class (32%) | Clerical, pink- and blue-collar workers with often low job security; common household incomes range from $16,000 to $30,000. High school education. | Working class (ca. 40–45%) | Blue-collar workers and those whose jobs are highly routinized with low economic security; a man making $40,000 and a woman making $26,000 may be typical. High school education. |
| Working poor (13%) | Service, low-rung clerical and some blue-collar workers. High economic insecurity and risk of poverty. Some high school education. | Lower class (ca. 14–20%) | Those who occupy poorly-paid positions or rely on government transfers. Some high school education. | Working class (ca. 40–45%) | Blue-collar workers and those whose jobs are highly routinized with low economic security; a man making $40,000 and a woman making $26,000 may be typical. High school education. |
| Underclass (12%) | Those with limited or no participation in the labor force. Reliant on government transfers. Some high school education. | Lower class (ca. 14–20%) | Those who occupy poorly-paid positions or rely on government transfers. Some high school education. | The poor (ca. 12%) | Those living below the poverty line with limited to no participation in the labor force; a household income of $18,000 may be typical. Some high school education. |
References: Gilbert, D. (2002) The American Class Structure: In An Age of Growing Inequality. Belmont, CA: Wadsworth, ISBN 0534541100. Thompson, W. & Hickey, J. (2005). Society in Focus. Boston, MA: Pearson, Allyn & Bacon; Beeghley, L. (2004). The Structure of Social Stratification in the United States. Boston, MA: Pearson, Allyn & Bacon.^{1} The upper middle class may also be referred to as "Professional class" Ehrenreich, B. (1989). The Inner Life of the Middle Class. NY, NY: Harper-Collins.

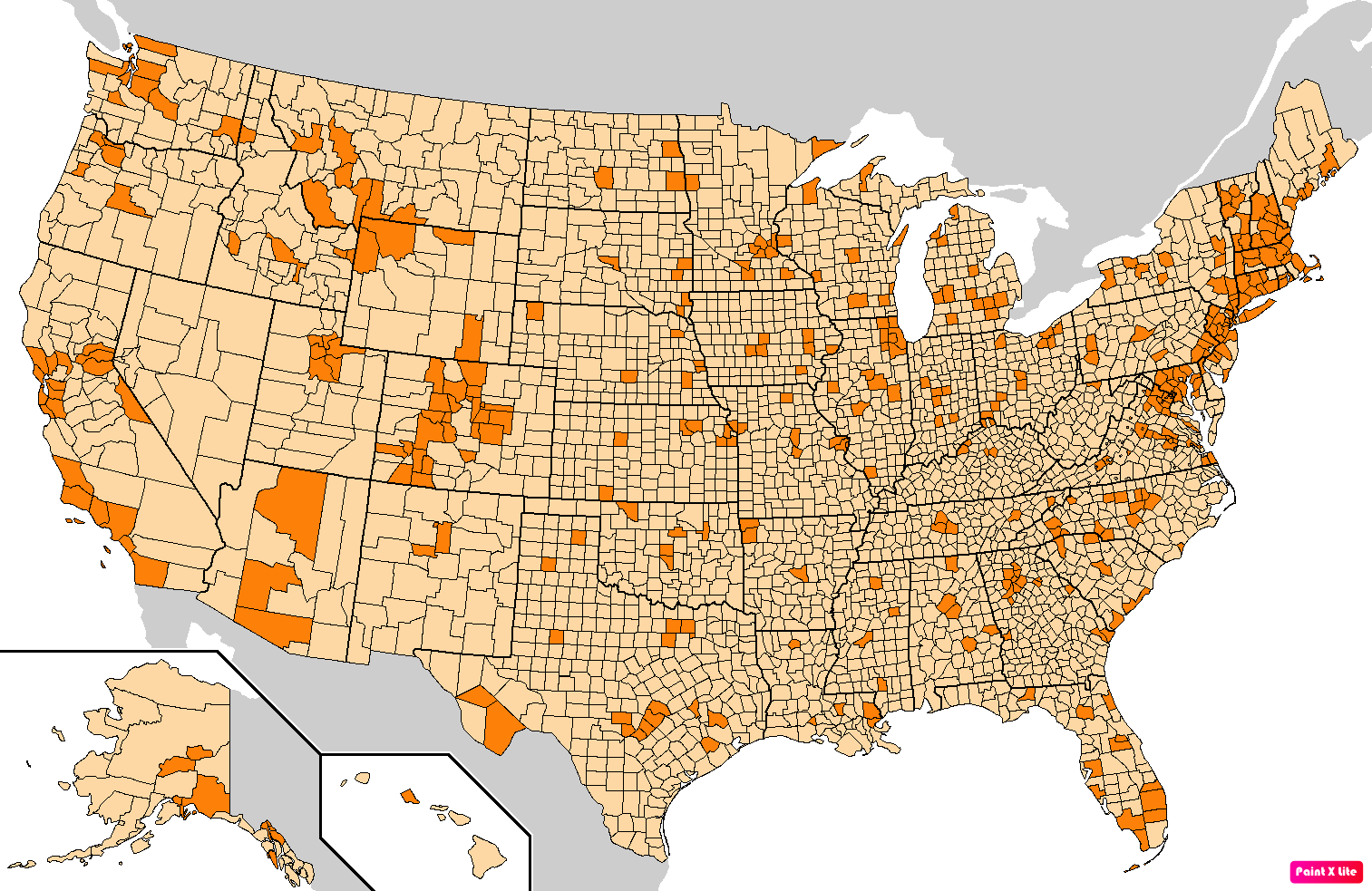
Counties in the United States by the percentage of the over 25-year-old population with bachelor's degrees according to the U.S. Census Bureau American Community Survey 2013–2017 5-Year Estimates. Counties with higher percentages of bachelor's degrees than the United States as a whole are in full orange.

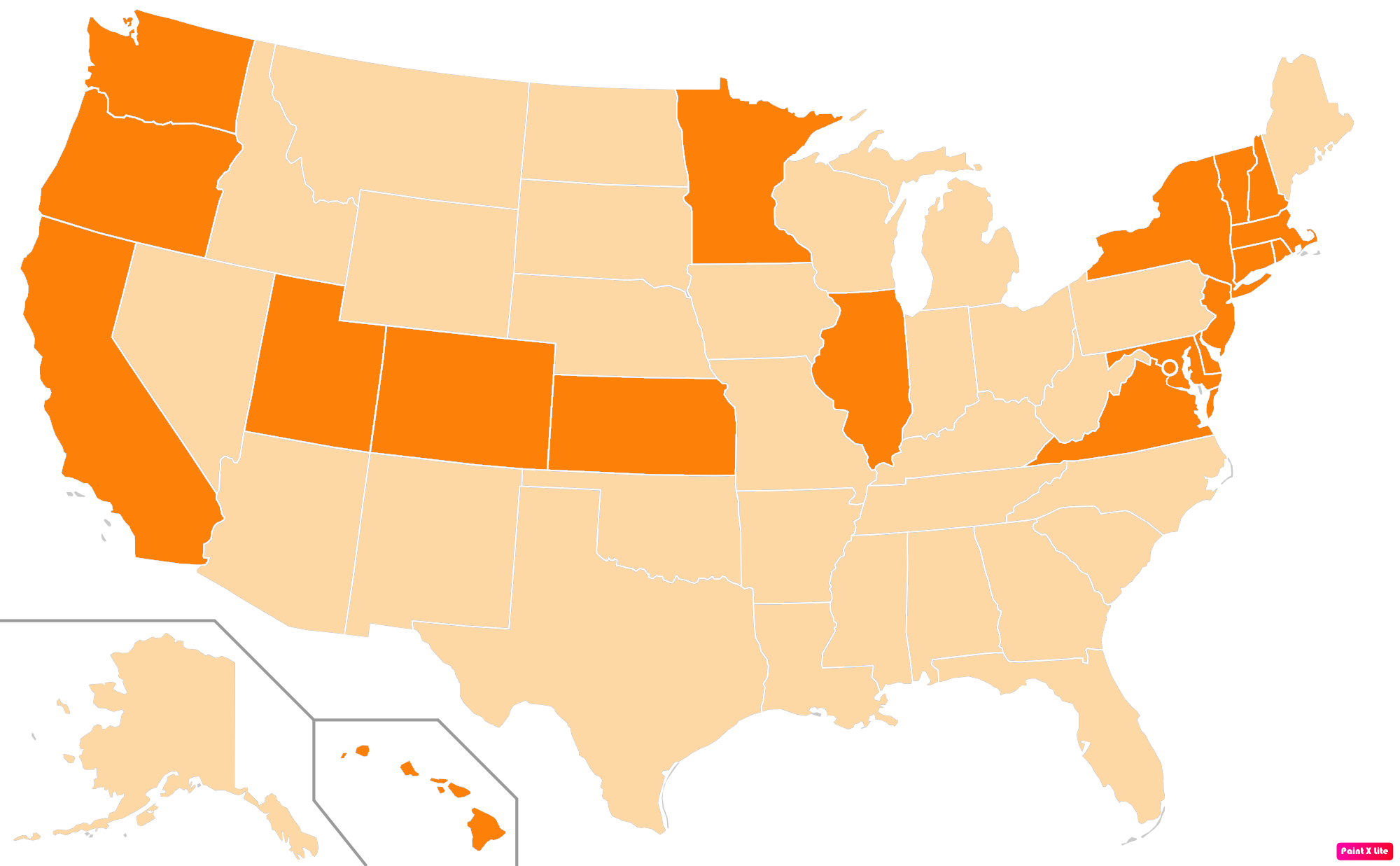
States in the United States by the percentage of the over 25-year-old population with bachelor's degrees according to the U.S. Census Bureau American Community Survey 2013–2017 5-Year Estimates. States with higher percentages of bachelor's degrees than the United States as a whole are in full orange.
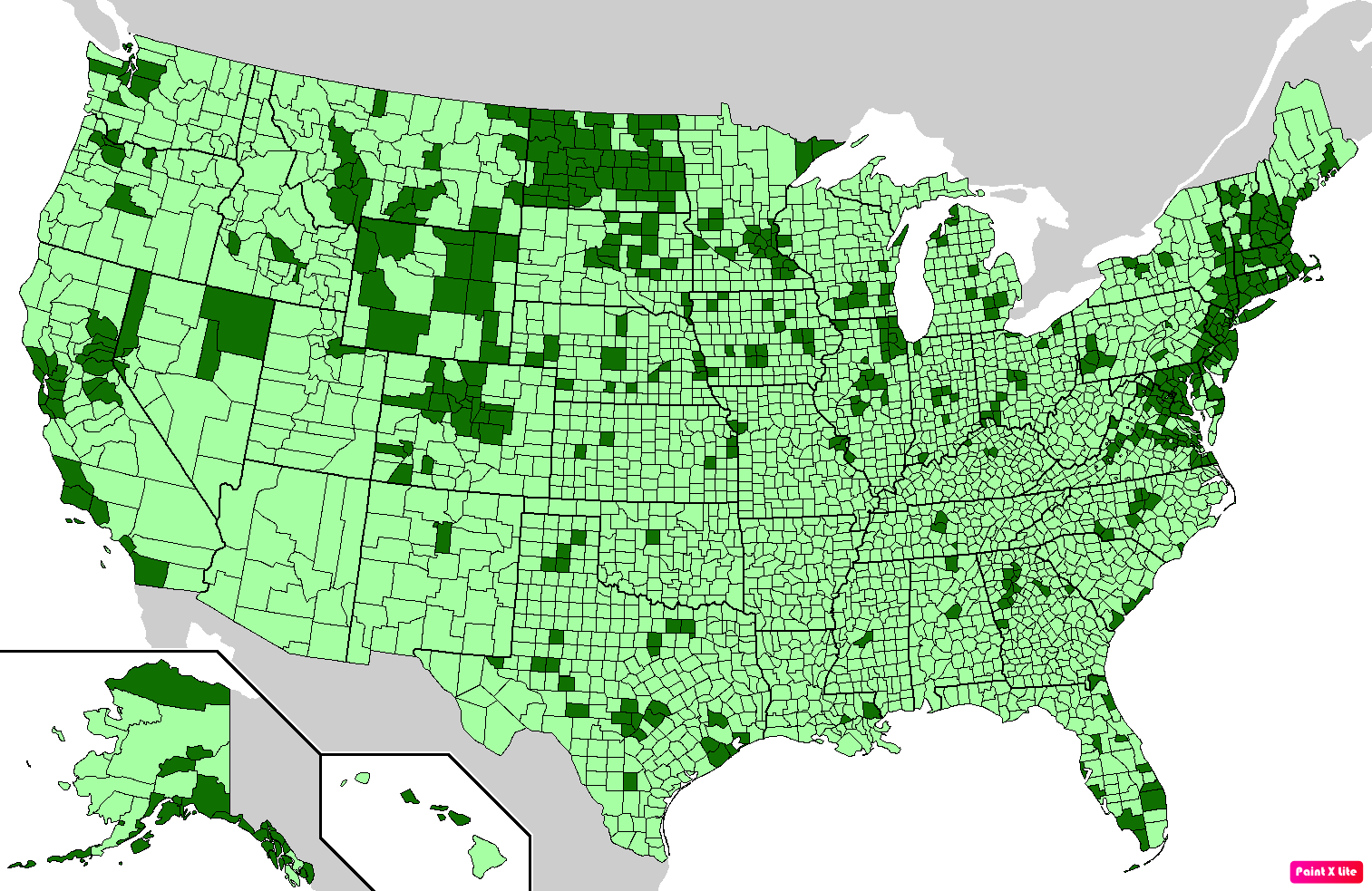
Counties in the United States by per capita income according to the U.S. Census Bureau American Community Survey 2013–2017 5-Year Estimates. Counties with per capita incomes higher than the United States as a whole are in full green.

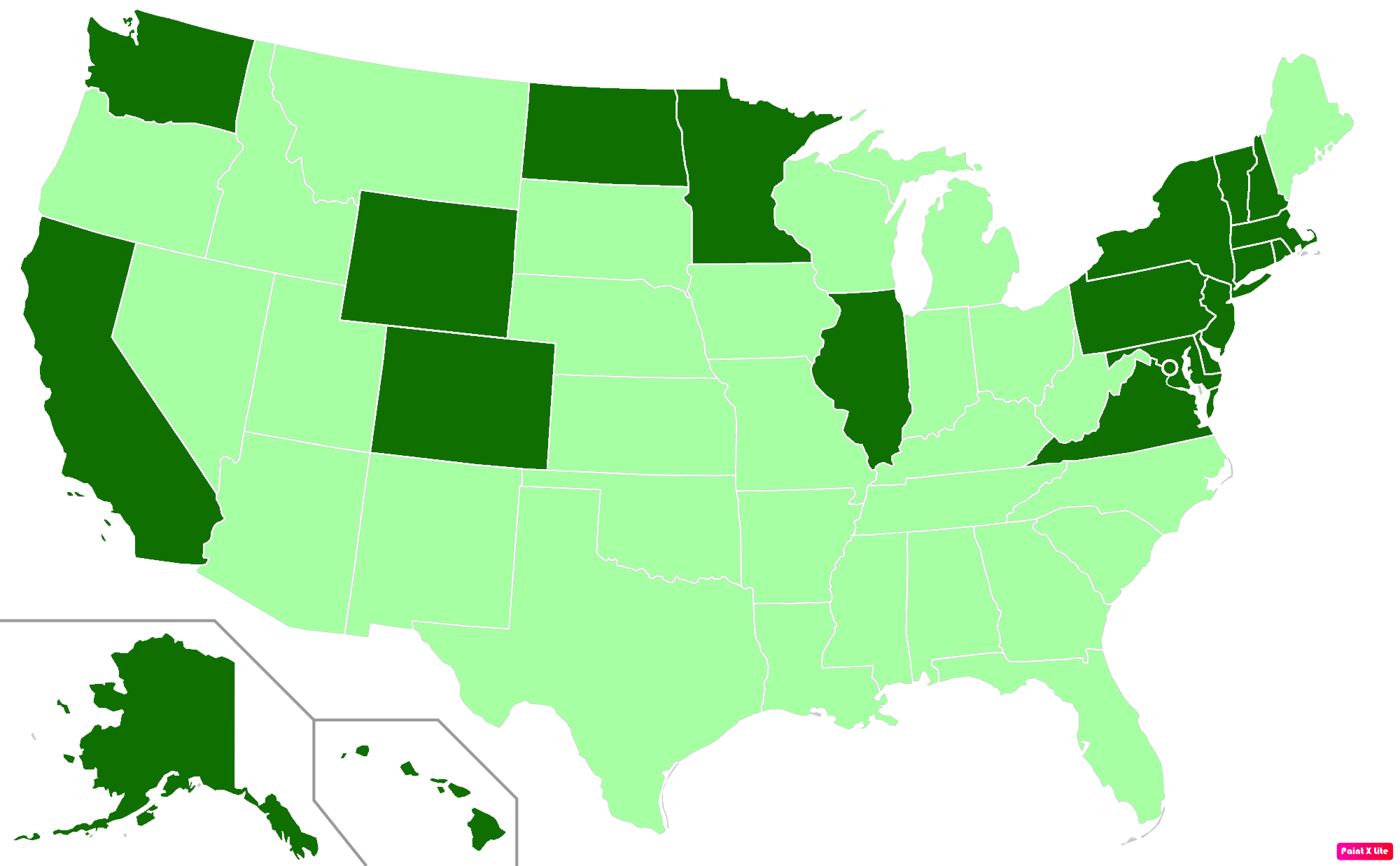
States in the United States by per capita income according to the U.S. Census Bureau American Community Survey 2013–2017 5-Year Estimates. States with per capita incomes higher than the United States as a whole are in full green.
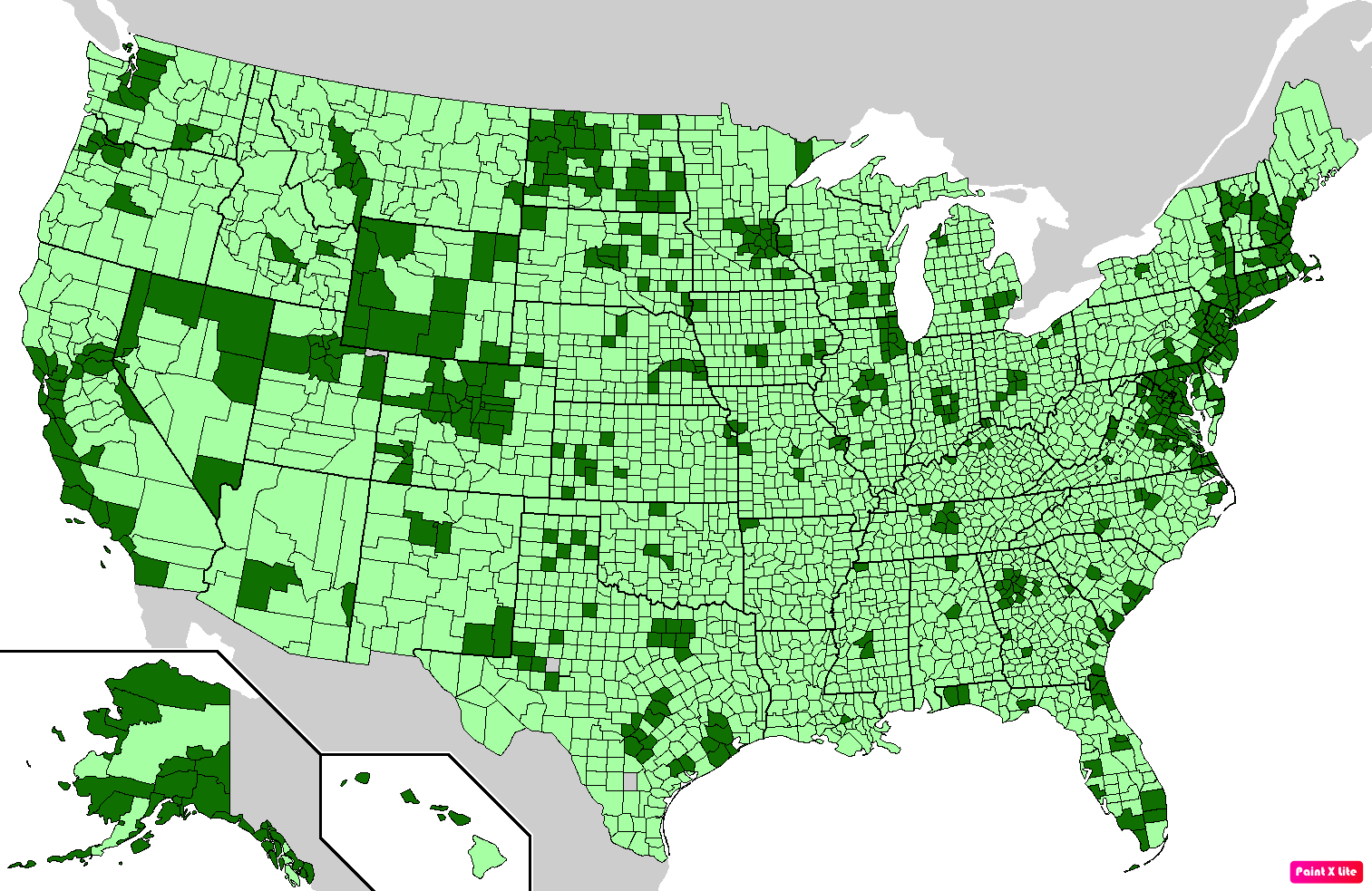
Counties in the United States by median nonfamily household income according to the U.S. Census Bureau American Community Survey 2013–2017 5-Year Estimates. Counties with median nonfamily household incomes higher than the United States as a whole are in full green.

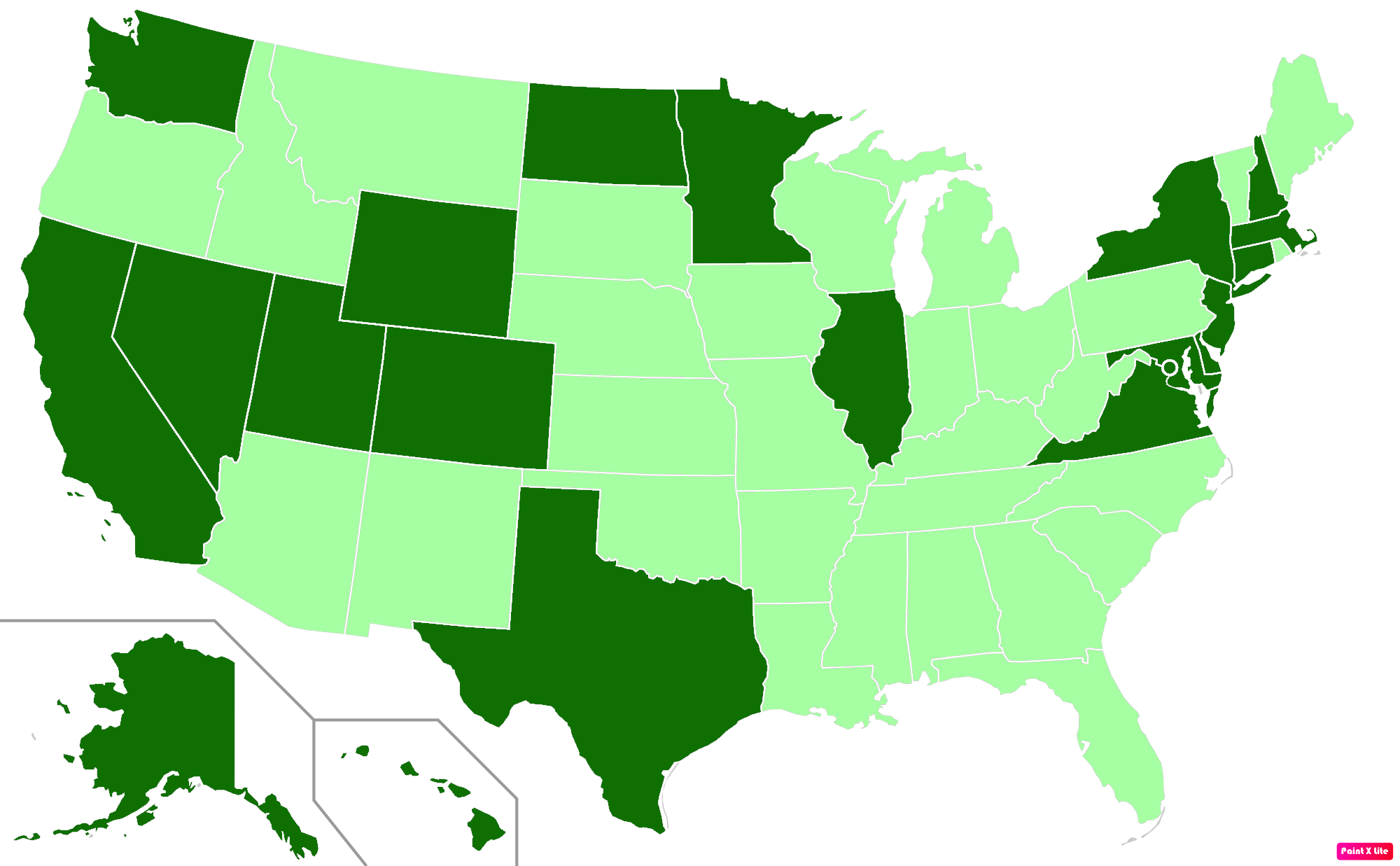
States in the United States by median nonfamily household income according to the U.S. Census Bureau American Community Survey 2013–2017 5-Year Estimates. States with median nonfamily household incomes higher than the United States as a whole are in full green.
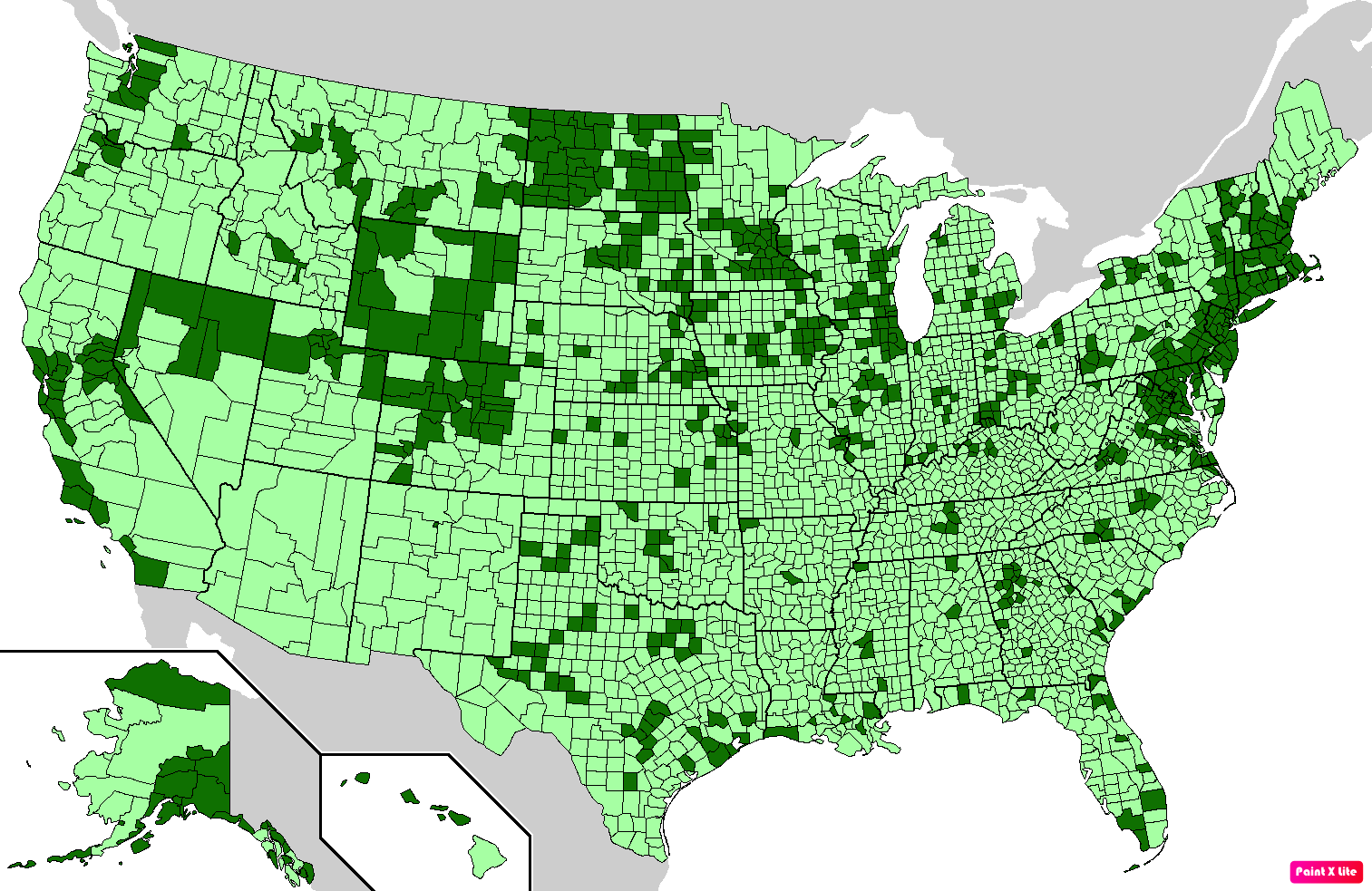
Counties in the United States by median family household income according to the U.S. Census Bureau American Community Survey 2013–2017 5-Year Estimates. Counties with median family household incomes higher than the United States as a whole are in full green.

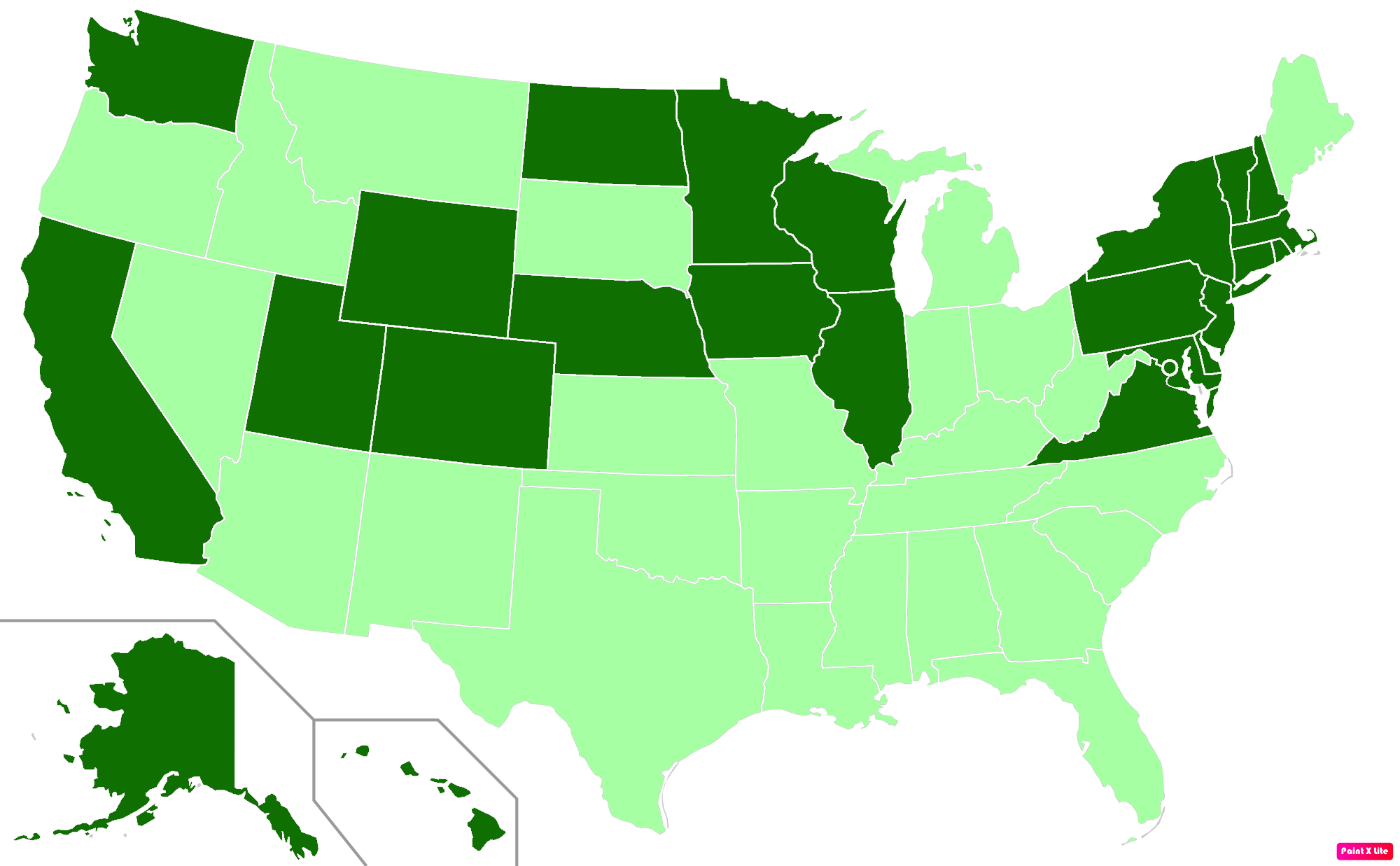
States in the United States by median family household income according to the U.S. Census Bureau American Community Survey 2013–2017 5-Year Estimates. States with median family household incomes higher than the United States as a whole are in full green.

== Upper class ==
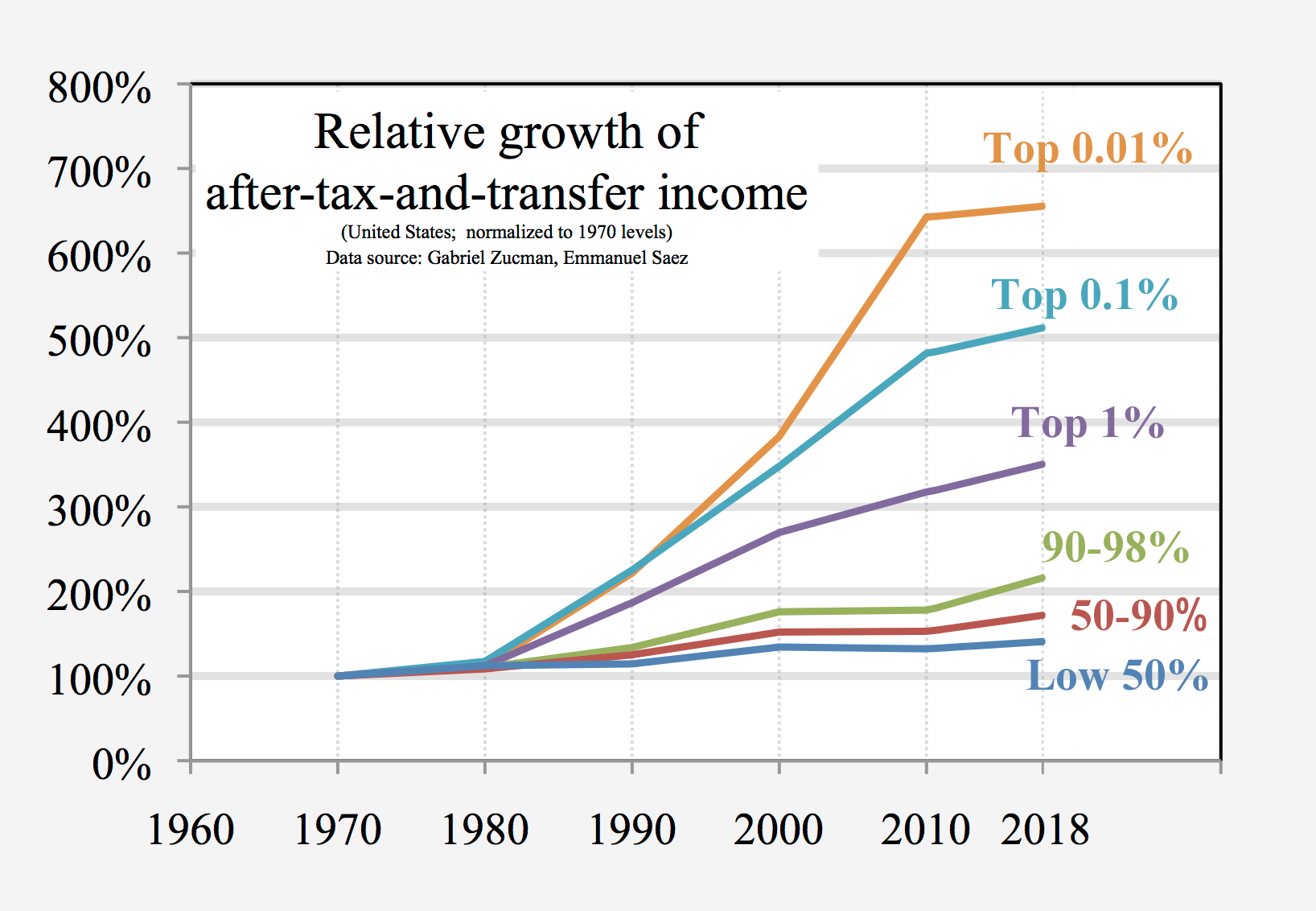
Both income growth and the decline in the progressivity of the tax code for the wealthy affect income, with the wealthiest earners seeing their effective tax rates decline.

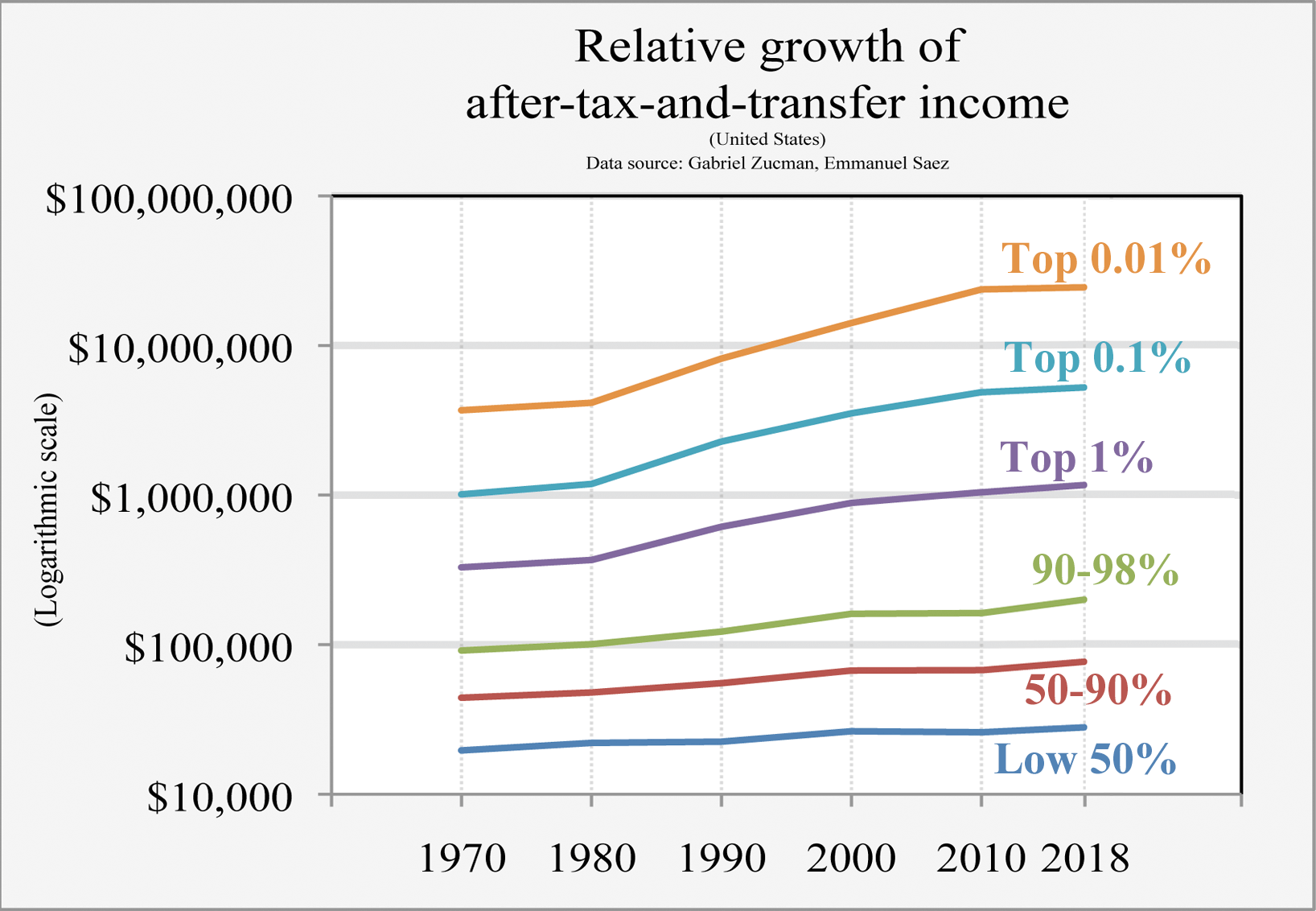
Same data as adjacent chart, but plotted on logarithmic scale to show absolute dollar amounts.

In 2025, the wealthiest 1% of Americans owned nearly 50% of the stock market. The top 10% own 87.2%, and the bottom half owned 1.1%.

The term upper class is applied to a wide array of elite groups existing in the United States of America. Because there is no defined lower threshold for the upper class it is difficult, if not outright impossible, to determine the exact number or percentage of American households that could be identified as being members of the upper-class(es). Most sociologists use the richest 1% of the population, but others use different benchmarks and characteristics.

Income and wealth statistics may serve as a helpful guideline as they can be measured in a more objective manner. Members of the upper class control and own significant portions of corporate America, and may exercise indirect power through the investment of capital. The high salaries and the potential for amassing great wealth through stock options have greatly increased the power and visibility of the "corporate elite".

=== Sources of wealth ===
==== Inherited wealth ====
Yet another important feature of the upper class is that of inherited privilege. While most Americans, including those in the upper-middle class, need to actively maintain their status, some upper class persons do not need to work in order to maintain their status. Status tends to be passed on from generation to generation without each generation having to re-certify its status. Overall, the upper class is financially the best compensated and one of the most influential socio-economic classes in American society.

==== Private companies ====
The upper class also includes owners of large private companies, including private equity companies. Privately held companies generally have fewer or less comprehensive reporting requirements and obligations for transparency than publicly traded companies do, thus making information about the income and wealth of their owners less well-known.

==== Corporate elite ====
The high salaries and, especially, the potential wealth through stock options, has supported the term corporate elite or corporate class. Top executives, including Chief Executive Officers, are among the financially best compensated occupations in the United States.

Top corporate executives of publicly traded companies receive most of their compensation by owning shares and stock options in their companies, on top of their substantial salaries. They are also on the board of directors with direct influence over their companies, not merely retail investors.

=== Categories of wealth ===
Net personal wealth in the U.S. since 1962

The average personal wealth of people in the top 1% is more than a thousand times that of people in bottom 50%.

The logarithmic scale shows how wealth has increased for all percentile groups, though moreso for wealthier people.

Wealth is commonly measured in terms of net worth, which is the sum of all assets minus all liabilities. Homeownership can contribute to wealth, but high-net worth individuals have their net worth primarily concentrated in illiquid assets such as bonds, real estate, and shares of corporations whose valuations are estimates.

Individuals with considerable net worth are described in the financial services industry as high-net-worth individuals, very-high-net-worth individuals, and ultra high-net-worth individuals:

- High-net-worth individuals (HNWI) are defined as holding financial assets (excluding their primary residence) valued over US$1 million.
- A very-high-net-worth individual (VHNWI) refers to someone with a net worth of at least US$5 million.
- An ultra-high-net-worth individual (UHNWI), holds US$30 million in investible assets.

The two charts in this section show the average net worth of individuals in the top 1%, top 10%, 50th to 90th percentile, and bottom half of the population from 1962 to 2021. As of 2021, the average person in the top 10% is a HNWI, while the average person in the top 1% is a VHNWI.

=== Upper class versus rich ===
In some academic models, the rich are considered to constitute 5% of U.S. households, and their wealth is largely in the form of financial assets, such as stocks, bonds, real estate, and private businesses. Sociologist Dennis Gilbert calls them the "working rich", and argues that this group is not part of the upper class but rather part of the upper middle class, as its standard of living is largely derived from occupation-generated income and its affluence falls far short of that attained by the top 1%.

Sociologist Leonard Beeghley considers total wealth to be the only significant distinguishing feature of this class and refers to the upper class simply as "the rich." Beeghley divides the rich into two sub-groups: the rich and the super-rich. This demographic constitutes roughly 1% of American households.

== Main classes ==
=== Upper middle class ===
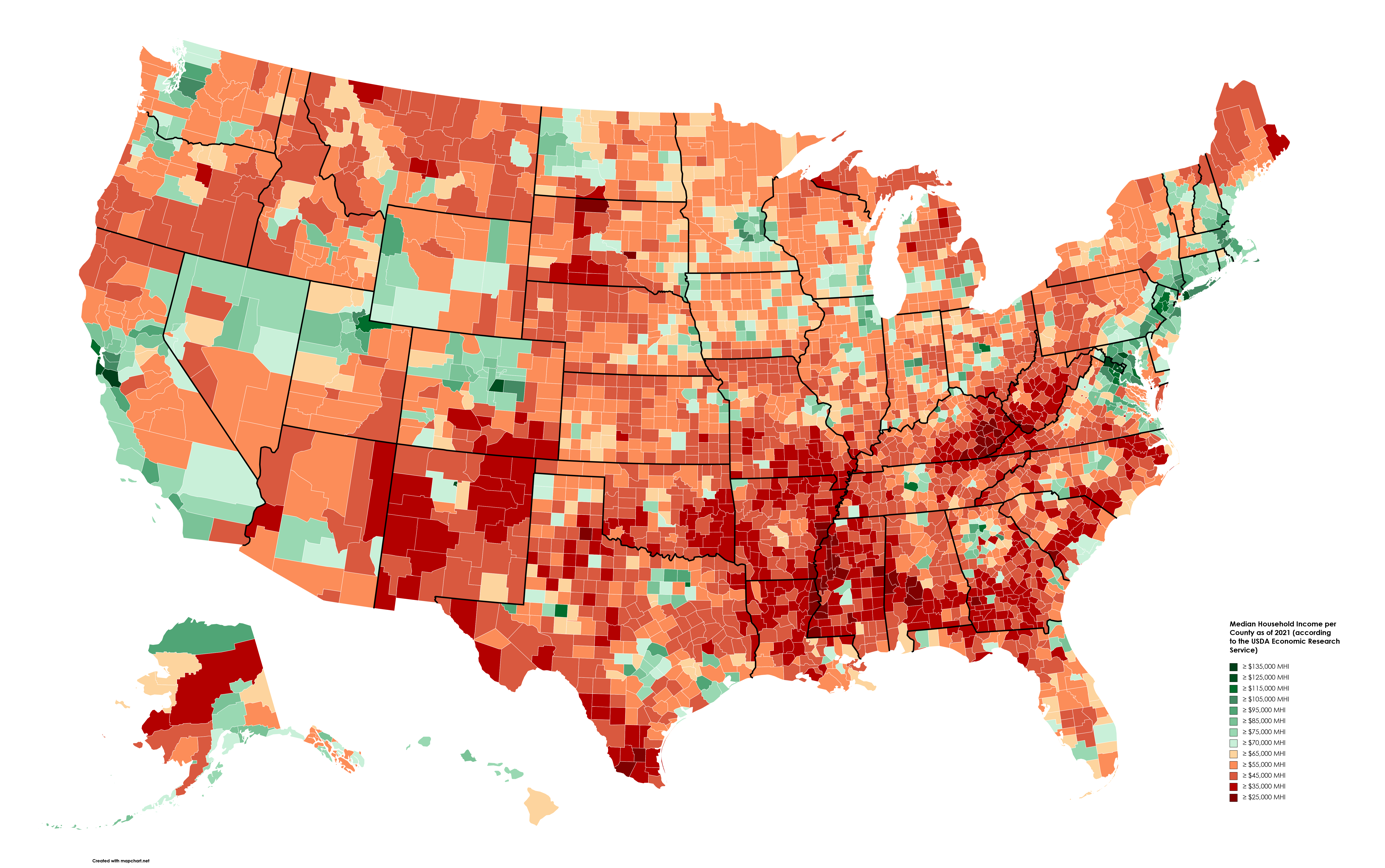
Median U.S. household income per County in 2021, showing the distribution of income geographically in the United States

The upper middle class consists of highly educated salaried professionals and small business owners whose work is largely self-directed. Many have advanced graduate degrees, and members of this class commonly value higher education. They are often involved with personal and professional networks, including professional organizations. The upper middle class tends to have great influence over the course of society.

Occupations which require high educational attainment are usually well compensated and held in high public esteem. Physicians, lawyers, accountants, engineers, scientists and professors are largely considered to be upper middle class. The very well educated are seen as trendsetters; the anti-smoking, pro-fitness, and organic food movements, as well as environmentalism, are largely indigenous to this socio-economic grouping. Education serves as perhaps the most important value and also the most dominant entry barrier of the upper middle class.

Sociologists Dennis Gilbert, Willam Thompson, and Joseph Hickey estimate the upper middle class to constitute roughly 15% of the population (or roughly three in every twenty persons). The hallmark of this class is its high educational attainment.

=== Middle class ===
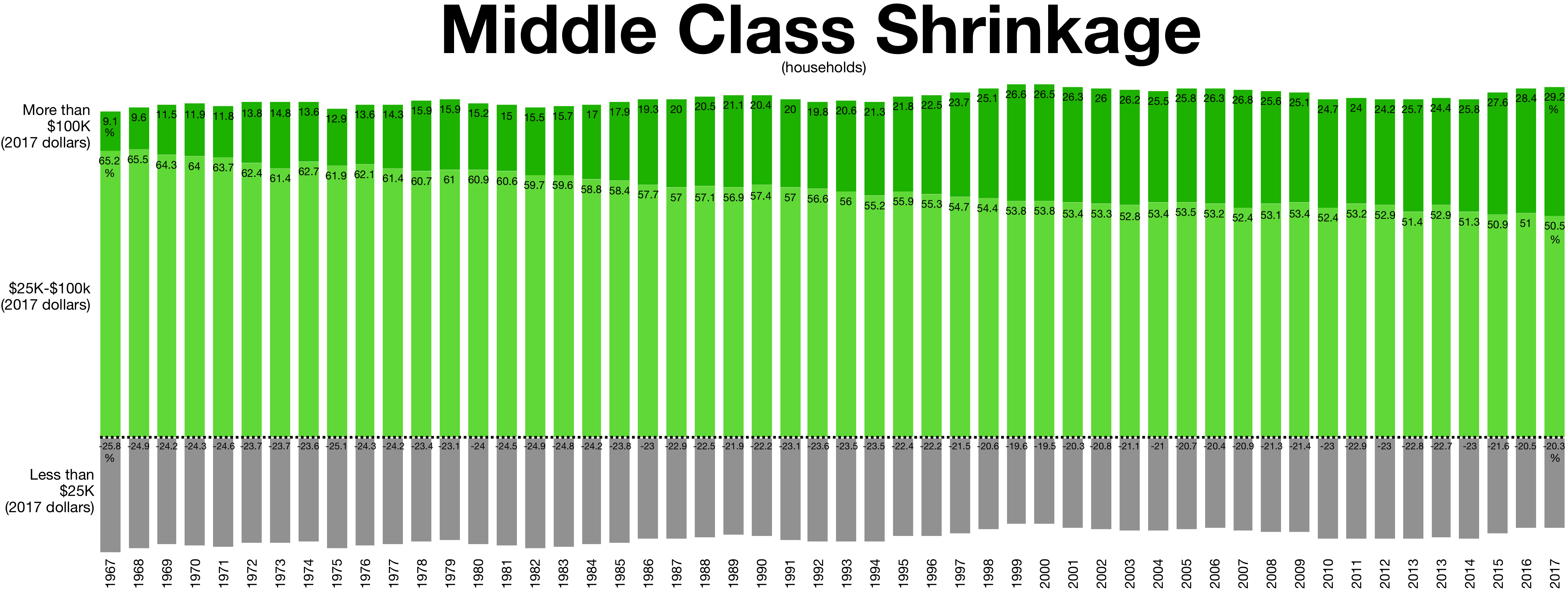
The middle class shrinkage

The middle class is perhaps the most vaguely defined of the social classes. The term can be used either to describe a relative elite of professionals and managers – also called the upper middle class – or it can be used to describe those in-between the extremes of wealth, disregarding considerable differences in income, culture, educational attainment, influence, and occupation.

As with all social classes in the United States, there are no definite answers as to what is and what is not middle class. Sociologists such as Dennis Gilbert, James Henslin, William Thompson, and Joseph Hickey have brought forth class models in which the middle class is divided into two sections that combined constitute 47% to 49% of the population. The upper middle or professional class constitutes the upper end of the middle class which consists of highly educated, well-paid professionals with considerable work autonomy. The lower end of the middle class – called either lower middle class or just middle class – consists of semi-professionals, craftsmen, office staff, and sales employees who often have college degrees and are very loosely supervised.

Everyone wants to believe they are middle class. For people on the bottom and the top of the wage scale the phrase connotes a certain Regular Joe cachet. But this eagerness to be part of the group has led the definition to be stretched like a bungee cord.

— Dante Chinni, the Christian Science Monitor

==== Traditional middle class ====
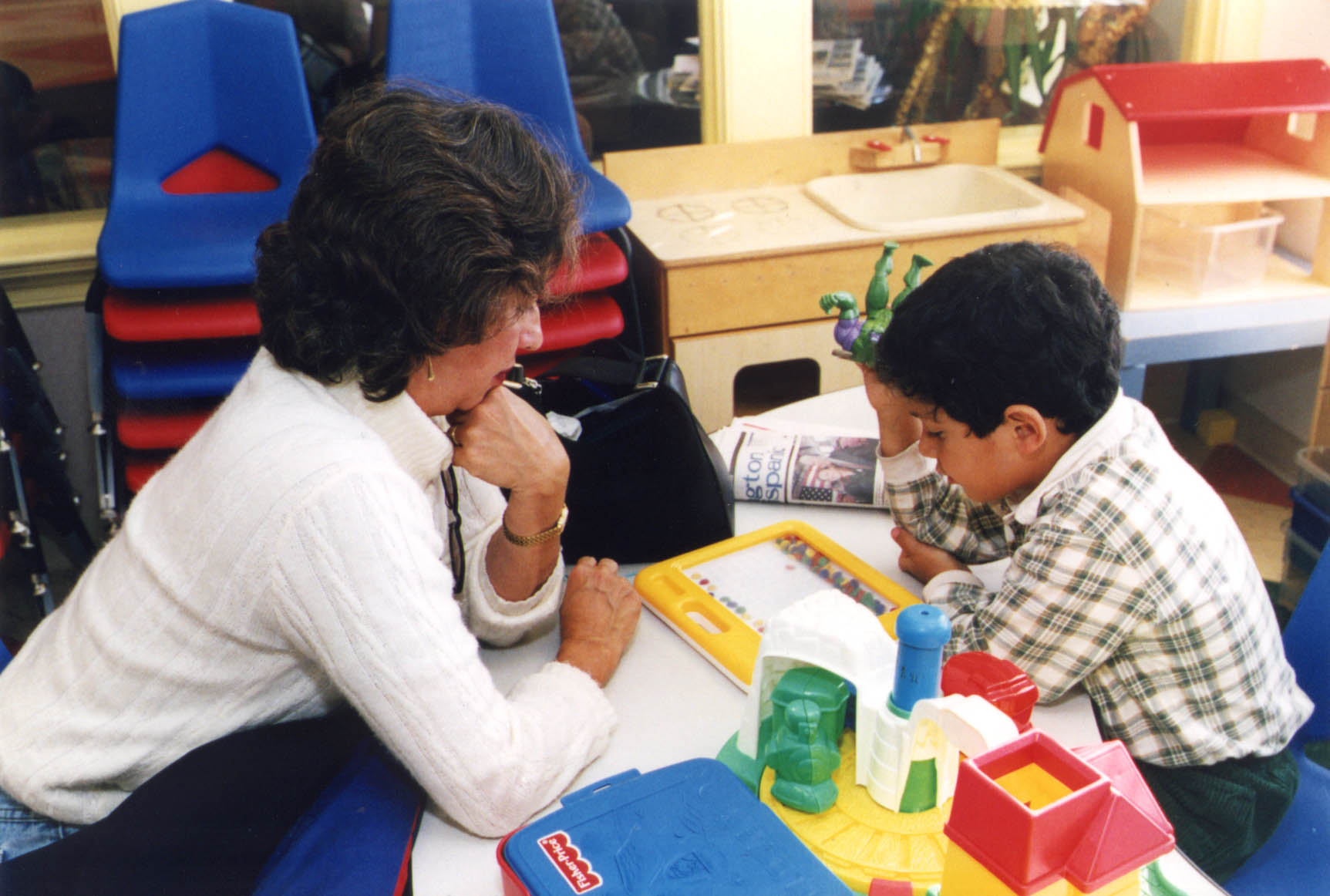
Many primary and secondary level teachers in the United States are in the middle class.

Those households more or less at the center of society may be referred to as being part of the American middle or middle-middle class in vernacular language use. In the academic models featured in this article, however, the middle class does not constitute a strong majority of the population. Those in the middle of the socio-economic strata—the proverbial Average Joe—are commonly in the area where the working and lower middle class overlap.

The most prominent academic models split the middle class into two sections. Yet, it remains common for the term middle class to be applied for anyone in between either extreme of the socio-economic strata. The middle class is then often sub-divided into an upper-middle, middle-middle, and lower-middle class. In colloquial descriptions of the class system the middle-middle class may be described as consisting of those in the middle of the social strata.

Politicians and television personalities such as Lou Dobbs have used the term middle class in this manner, especially when discussing the middle-class squeeze. The wide discrepancy between the academic models and public opinions that lump highly educated professionals together in the same class with secretaries may lead to the conclusion that public opinion on the subject has become largely ambiguous.

==== Lower middle class ====
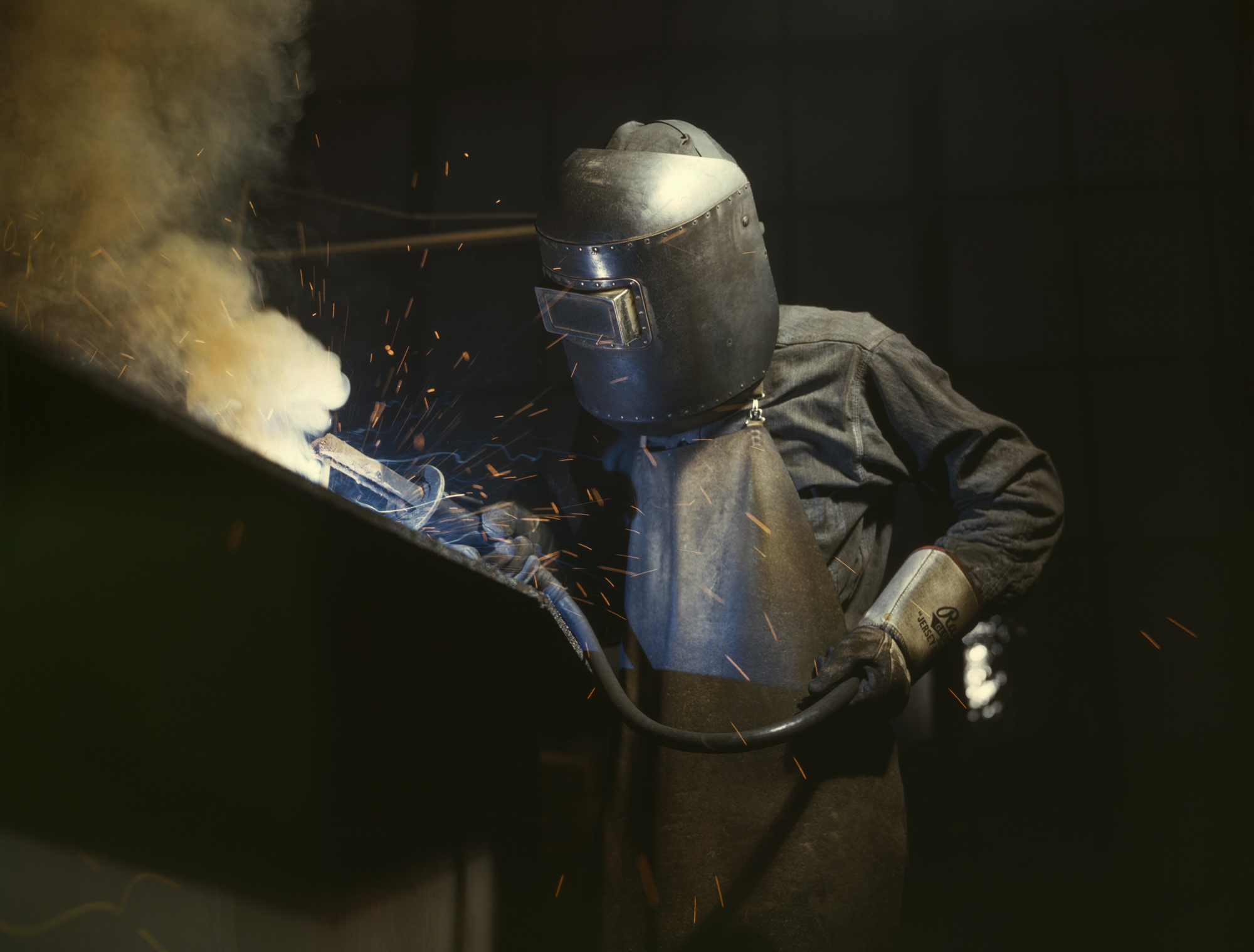
A welder is a skilled tradesperson.

The lower middle class is, as the name implies, generally defined as those who occupy the lower portion of the middle class. People in this class commonly work in supporting occupations that are closely supervised but require significant training, such as tradespeople, sales agents, and semiprofessionals.

The terms "skilled worker," "craftsman," "artisan," and "tradesman" were used in senses that overlap. All describe people with specialized training in the skills needed for a particular kind of work. ... Skilled workers in the building trades (e.g. carpenters, masons, plumbers, painters, plasterers, glaziers) were also referred to by one or another of these terms.

Sociologists Dennis Gilbert, William Thompson, and Joseph Hickey, however, only divide the middle class into two groups. In their class modes the middle class only consists of an upper and lower middle class. The upper middle class, as described above, constitutes roughly 15% of the population with highly educated white collar professionals. Semi-professionals and tradespeople with some college degrees constitute the lower middle class. Their class models show the lower middle class positioned slightly above the middle of the socio-economic strata.

=== Working class and lower class ===
Definitions of the term "working class" vary greatly. Michael Zweig, an economist for Stony Brook University, argued in 2001 that the working class constitutes the majority of the population. Economists and pollsters in the United States generally define working class adults as those lacking tertiary education degrees. This is an oxymoron when applied to those lacking degrees but are unemployed or retired, and therefore not working. According to Frank Newport, "for some, working class is a more literal label; namely, an indication that one is working." Generally, those in blue-collar and pink-collar occupations are referred to as working class in the class models referred to in this article.

Dennis Gilbert places 13% of households among the "working poor" with 12% being in the "underclass". Thompson & Hickey place roughly 17% to 20% of households in the lower classes. The lower classes constituting roughly a fifth to a quarter of American society consists mainly of low-rung retail and service workers as well as the frequently unemployed and those not able to work. Overall, 13% of the population fall below the poverty threshold. Hunger and food insecurity were present in the lives of 3.9% of American households, while roughly twenty-five million Americans (ca. 9%) participated in the food stamp program.

== Occupations ==
Some sociologists attempt to draw a distinction between laborers, tradespeople, and professionals, when creating class systems.

- Laborers such as bus drivers, truck drivers, cleaning laborers, and landscapers "rely heavily on physical exertion," while those in the skilled trades rely on and are known for "specific knowledge, skills, and abilities."
- Tradespeople usually gain their skills through work experience, on-the-job training, an apprenticeship program, and certification.
- Professionals require substantial education, typically at least a bachelor's degree and often graduate degrees, and have a higher duty of care. They routinely make decisions "on the basis of expertise and ability in complex situations, where there may be no, or little, previous history."

=== Examples of laborers ===
Unskilled blue-collar labor includes warehousing, mining, excavation, custodial work, farming, fishing, logging, landscaping, pest control, food processing, oil field work, waste collection and disposal, recycling, construction, maintenance, shipping, driving, and trucking.

Unskilled pink-collar labor includes the hairstylists, cosmetology, waiting staff, domestic workers, receptionist, social work, secretarial work, and child care.

=== Examples of trades ===
- Carpentry - woodworking, framing, doors/windows, drywall, insulation, flooring, siding, finishing work, cabinetry, furniture.
- Plumbing - plumbing fixtures, piping and plumbing fitting, water heater, steamfitter, GreenPlumbers, and drain cleaner.
- Electrician - wiring, light fixture/major appliance, solar power installation, electric motor/generator technician, electronics technician.
- Welding - MIG, TIG, stick, welding joints, welding symbols, and metalworking.
- Masonry - concrete work, bricks/blocks/stones, troweling, and tiling.
- HVAC - heating, ventilation, air conditioning, and duct work.
- Painting - staining, wallpaper, paint mixing, plasterwork, and spackling paste.
- Roofing - shingles, standing seam metal roof, corrugated metal roof, solar roofs, rubber shingles, rain gutters.
- Mechanic - auto mechanic/restoration/scrapping, refrigeration/air conditioning, boiler, millwright/industrial mechanic.
- Metal fabrication - machinist, lathes, milling, drilling, grinding, and CNC machining.
- Sewing - machine sewing, hand stitching, embroidery, tailor, quilting, fashion design, costume design, 3D clothes modeling, upholstery, knitting, tapestry, crochet.
- Culinary chef - baker, meat cutter\fishmonger, deli, cheesemonger, sushi itamae, and cook.

=== Examples of professions ===
Highly educated white collar professionals include physicians, dentists, lawyers, accountants, engineers, military officers, economists, business analysis, urban planners, university professors, architects, stockbrokers, psychologists, scientists, actuaries, optometrists, statistician, speech-language pathologist, occupational therapist, physical therapists, pharmacists, veterinarians, high-level civil servants, and the intelligentsia.

== Class and health ==
Income also has a significant impact on health as those with higher incomes have better access to healthcare facilities, higher life expectancy, lower infant mortality rate and increased health consciousness. In 2006, Harvard researchers divided the United States into "eight Americas." A 2024 study from University of Washington researchers added two more segments to make it "ten Americas".

Life expectancy ranges from 84.9 years for Asian Americans who had an average per capita income of $21,566, to 71.1 years for urban African-Americans with an average per capita income of $14,800.

Furthermore, like other post-industrial nations, the United States saw increased health consciousness among persons of higher social status. Persons of higher status are less likely to smoke, more likely to exercise regularly, and be more conscious of their diet. Additionally, poorer Americans are more likely to consume lower quality, processed foods. One can therefore conclude that low socio-economic status contributes to a person's likelihood of being obese.

== Class and politics ==
A study by Larry Bartels found a positive correlation between Senate votes and opinions of high income people, conversely, low income people had a negative correlation with Senate votes.

Democratic nominee Kamala Harris won the highest-income voters in the 2024 United States presidential election, despite losing the presidential election.

Many politically powerful people make money before coming to office, but in general the political power elite have official incomes in the $150,000 to $185,000 range; members of Congress are paid $174,000, and are effectively required to have a residence in their district as well as one in Washington.

The relationship between class and politics is less about partisan affiliation and more about the level of political influence. Those in the upper class and upper middle class have the greatest influence. According to Pew Research, nearly all members of the 118th Congress had a Bachelor's degree, specifically 94% in the House and 99% in the Senate. This was far higher than the 38% of American adults age 25+ with a Bachelor's degree in 2023. Using the Gilbert Model described earlier, as well as the fact the congressional salary is $174,000 a year, members of the United States Congress can classified as members of the upper middle class and upper class.

In the 2024 United States presidential election, the voting patterns along income lines inverted for the first time, except among Black voters. Democratic nominee Kamala Harris won voters making over $100,000 and $200,000 a year despite losing the presidential election. This was the first time the Democratic Party won the highest-income voters while losing the presidential election. Harris in particular did very well among White women with college degrees and voters with graduate degrees, winning them 58-41% and 59-38%, respectively. Harris's strongest income demographic consisted of voters making over $200,000 a year, winning 52-46%. Harris is a Black woman with a Juris Doctor, who also won Black women 92-7%.

Among white voters, educational attainment was strongly positively correlated with increased support for Harris. Harris lost white voters with high school or less 25-73%, an Associate's degree 31-67%, and some college 38-61%. Harris tied among whites with a bachelor's degree 49-49%, and won whites with a graduate degree 58-40%.

== Existence of distinct class groupings ==
Some academics consider American society sociologically and economically fragmented in such a manner that no clear class distinctions can be made. This means that there are no pronounced breaks in socioeconomic strata, which makes class division highly subjective and disputable. Others, such as sociologist Dennis Gilbert, dispute the concept of a well-mixed society, and claim that distinct social networks can be identified for each class. W. Lloyd Warner also asserts the existence of class markers:

We are proud of those facts of American life that fit the pattern we are taught but somehow we are often ashamed of those equally important social facts which demonstrate the presence of social class. Consequently, we tend to deny them, or worse, denounce them and by doing so we tend to deny their existence and magically make them disappear from consciousness.

— W. Lloyd Warner, What is Social Class in America, 1949

Warner asserts that social class is as old as civilization itself and has been present in nearly every society from before the Roman Empire, through medieval times, and to the modern-day United States. He believes that complex societies such as the United States need an equally complex social hierarchy.

== See also ==
- American gentry
- Class: A Guide Through the American Status System
- Caste system in India
  - Caste-related violence in India
- Global elite
- Income inequality in the United States
- Racial inequality in the United States
- Social class in American history
- Social stratification
