= Class: A Guide Through the American Status System =

1983 nonfiction book by Paul Fussell

- Author: Paul Fussell
- Language: English
- Subject: Social class in the United States
- Genre: Non-fiction
- Publisher: Simon & Schuster
- Publication date: 1983
- Publication place: United States
- ISBN: 9780671449919

Class: A Guide Through the American Status System is a nonfiction book by Paul Fussell originally published in 1983 by Simon & Schuster, and reissued in 1992.

== Class structure ==
Fussell argues that social class in the United States is more complex in structure than simply three (upper, middle, and lower) classes. Fussell divided American society into nine strata — from the idle rich, which he called "the top out-of-sight," to the institutionalized and imprisoned, which he labeled "the bottom out-of-sight."

Fussell identifies the following nine classes:

- Top out-of-sight: The highest class in American society began to conceal themselves and their wealth during the Great Depression and continues to do so.
- Upper
- Upper middle: The upper middle class earns most of its money rather than inherits it, and works in professions such as law, medicine, real estate, and business.
- Middle
- High Proletarian: Skilled workers. This class might earn as much money as the middle class, but they perform work that is more physically demanding.
- Mid-Proletarian
- Low Proletarian
- Destitute
- Bottom out-of-sight

Fussell coins the term "Category X" for people who remove themselves from the American class system despite having been born into an identifiable class.

== Top ==
Top out-of-sight are those with immense wealth who live in private luxury and do not interact socially with other classes. Their mansions are situated far from public roads behind high walls, and are thus literally out-of-sight.

Uppers and Upper middles generally do not socialize with Middles, but Middles hope to find them on cruise ship vacations. Uppers and Upper middles do not engage in a lot of creative work or analytical thinking, instead relying on tradition. Uppers live on inherited wealth, while Upper middles include those financially successful through their own work, e.g. movie stars and millionaire entrepreneurs.

== Middle ==
Fussell argues that the American middle class has experienced "prole drift" dragging it downward and effectively joining it to the proletarian class. Whereas a university education used to be rarer and a clear class divider separating middles from the high school education of proles, Fussell reports that the vast proliferation of hundreds of mediocre "universities" in the U.S. has rendered this an ineffective class distinction. (This trend continued long after the book was published: there were 4,298 degree-granting postsecondary institutions in the U.S. in the 2017–2018 school year.) Education at an elite Ivy league institution retains class status despite the abundance of universities in the US. Unlike the classes above and below, members of this middle group are insecure in their class status and are in constant fear of slipping down while hoping to jump up to higher classes. Fussell notes that a fiberglass Chris-Craft was a common prole and middle class pleasure boat meant to ape the precious wood yachts of the upper classes. Middles are terrified of causing conflict and resort to innocuous topics of conversation to avoid intellectual debate.

== Bottom ==
Destitutes have virtually no capital or income, and include the incarcerated and the institutionalized, who are guarded by proles. Bottom out-of-sight are the homeless, living under bridges or otherwise separated from society. Although they occupy opposite ends of the class spectrum, both Top out-of-sight and Bottom out-of-sight groups are physically separated from the other classes.

== Category X ==
In the final chapter, The X Way Out, Fussell identifies "category X" people who exist outside of the US class structure. Fussell argues that it is essentially impossible to change one's social class —up or down — but it is possible to extricate oneself from the class system by existing outside the system as a X person. (In the US, Middles and proles are conditioned to believe in meritocracy, despite class mobility being among the lowest in industrialized economies.) He states that X people do self-directed work without a boss or supervisor; they are writers, artists, musicians and other "creative" types. X people dress comfortably, wearing L. L. Bean, Lands' End, and thrift store purchases. They drink wine, gin, and vodka — but not famous advertised brand names. X people speak multiple languages and are familiar with many cities internationally, often simply for the joy of knowledge. X people generally disregard social norms because they have no interest in class status and disdain the Middles who are so concerned with it. Fussell names the Mark Twain character Huckleberry Finn as an archetypal Category X person.

== Reception ==
In a 2009 review for The Atlantic, Sandra Tsing Loh stated: "The experience of reading (and re-reading) Class is akin to wiping goggles one didn't know were fogged". The book review website The Pequod rated the book a 9.5 (out of 10.0) and called it "Paul Fussell's most sustained work of genius, a razor-sharp and bitterly savage exploration of the class rigidities of our supposedly classless society." Writing in Esquire, Dwight Garner found the book "impossible to put down because its sentences were so crisp, honest, and witty. It was more impossible to put down because it addressed a topic that I sensed had a moonlike pull over human affairs in general and my life in particular, but that no one spoke about."

The chapter on "Category X" people was described as "insufferably self-regarding" by David Brooks in a 2021 article on bourgeois bohemians; Brooks states that Class is "a caustic and extravagantly snobby tour through the class markers prevalent at the time."

== See also ==
- Social class in the United States
- Socioeconomic mobility in the United States
- Myth of meritocracy
- Affluence in the United States
- Poverty in the United States
- Income inequality in the United States
- Social class in American history
- Class: A View From Middle England
