= American middle class =

Social class in the United States

Though the American middle class does not have a definitive definition, contemporary social scientists have put forward several ostensibly congruent theories on it. Depending on the class model used, the middle class constitutes anywhere from 25% to 75% of households.

One of the first major studies of the middle class in America was White Collar: The American Middle Classes, published in 1951 by sociologist C. Wright Mills. Later sociologists such as Dennis Gilbert commonly divide the middle class into two sub-groups: the professional or upper middle class (~15-20% of all households) consisting of highly educated, salaried professionals and managers, and the lower middle class (~33% of all households) consisting mostly of semi-professionals, skilled craftsmen and lower-level management. Middle-class persons commonly have a comfortable standard of living, significant economic security, considerable work autonomy and rely on their expertise to sustain themselves.

Members of the middle class belong to diverse groups which overlap with each other. Overall, middle-class persons, especially upper-middle-class individuals, are characterized by conceptualizing, creating and consulting. Thus, college education is one of the main indicators of middle-class status. Largely attributed to the nature of middle-class occupations, middle class values tend to emphasize independence, adherence to intrinsic standards, valuing innovation and respecting non-conformity. The middle class is more politically active than other demographics. The middle classes are very influential as they encompass the majority of voters, writers, teachers, journalists and editors. Most societal trends in the U.S. originate within the middle classes.

According to a 2021 Pew Research study that classifies adults as middle class if they belong to a household with income between 2/3 and 2x median household income ($52k-$156k for a household of three), the percentage of Americans in the middle class declined from 61% to 50% over the previous five decades (1971–2021) with 4% moving down into the lower class and 7% moving up into the upper class. In 2019, as defined by the Future of the Middle Class Initiative to be the middle 60 percent of the income distribution, and looking only at individuals 25-54: 59 percent were white, 18 percent Hispanic, 12 percent Black, and 10 percent “other.”

== Definition ==
Scholars have a variety of technical measures of who is middle-class. By contrast public opinion has a variety of implicit measures. The definitions seem to stretch quite a great deal depending on the political cause that is being invoked or defended, as one commentator noted:

Well, it depends on whom you ask. Everyone wants to believe they are middle class. For people on the bottom and the top of the wage scale the phrase connotes a certain Regular Joe cachet. But this eagerness to be part of the group has led the definition to be stretched like a bungee cord - used to defend/attack/describe everything from the Earned Income Tax Credit to the estate tax.

Some scholars have emphasized factors such as education and culture. Those households more or less at the center of society may be referred to as being part of the American middle or "middle-middle class" in vernacular language use. In some academic models of social class, however, the middle class does not constitute a strong majority of the population. Those in the middle of the socio-economic strata—the proverbial "Average Joe"—are commonly in the area where the working and lower middle classes overlap.

=== Education ===
Tertiary education (or "higher education") is required for many middle-class professions, depending on how the term middle class is to be defined. Educational attainment is also directly linked to income.

Although 90% of the population has graduated from high school, the average American does not have a college degree, but has likely attended college for some time. Overall, educational attainment serves as the perhaps most essential class feature of the middle class, being directly linked to income and occupation. Per the table below, as of 2018 less than half of American adults over the age of 25 had an associate degree or higher, and less than 40% had a bachelor's degree or higher.

Educational attainment in the United States (2018)
Education	Age 25 and over	Age 25–30
High school diploma or GED	89.80%	92.95%
Some college	61.28%	66.34%
Associate degree	45.16%	46.72%
Bachelor's degree	34.98%	36.98%
Master's degree	13.04%	9.01%
Professional degree	3.47%	2.02%
Doctorate	2.03%	1.12%

A 2021 Pew Research study that classifies adults as middle class if they belong to a household with income between 2/3 and 2x median household income ($52k-$156k for a household of three) found that 48% of adults with bachelor's degrees were considered middle class (while 39% of adults with bachelor's degrees were upper class).

== Sub-divisions ==
The middle class by one definition consists of an upper middle class, made up of professionals distinguished by exceptionally high educational attainment as well as high economic security; and a lower middle class, consisting of semi-professionals. While the groups overlap, differences between those at the center of both groups are considerable.

The lower middle class has lower educational attainment, considerably less workplace autonomy, and lower incomes than the upper middle class. With the emergence of a two-tier labor market, the economic benefits and life chances of upper middle class professionals have grown considerably compared to those of the lower middle class.

The lower middle class needs two income earners in order to sustain a comfortable standard of living, while many upper middle class households can maintain a similar standard of living with just one income earner.

=== Professional/managerial middle class ===
The "professional–managerial class" consists mostly of highly educated white collar salaried professionals, whose work is largely self-directed. Class members typically hold graduate degrees, with educational attainment serving as the main distinguishing feature of this class.

These professionals typically conceptualize, create, consult, and supervise. As a result, upper middle class employees enjoy great autonomy in the work place and are more satisfied with their careers than non-professional middle class individuals. In terms of financial wealth income, the professional middle class fits in the top third, but seldom reach the top 5% of American society. According to sociologists such as Dennis Gilbert, James M. Henslin, Joseph Hickey, and William Thompson, the upper middle class constitutes 15% of the population.

The upper middle class has grown... and its composition has changed. Increasingly salaried managers and professionals have replaced individual business owners and independent professionals. The key to the success of the upper-middle-class is the growing importance of educational certification... its lifestyles and opinions are becoming increasingly normative for the whole society. It is in fact a porous class, open to people... who earn the right credentials.

— Dennis Gilbert, The American Class Structure, 1998.

Values and mannerisms are difficult to pinpoint for a group encompassing millions of persons. Naturally, any large group of people will feature social diversity to some extent. However, some generalizations can be made using education and income as class defining criteria. William Thompson and Joseph Hickey noted that upper middle class individuals have a more direct and confident manner of speech. In her 1989 publication Effects of Social Class and Interactive Setting on Maternal Speech, Erica Hoff-Ginsberg found that among her surveyed subjects, "upper-middle class mothers talked more per unit of time and sustained longer interactions with children". She also found that the speech of upper middle-class mothers differs "in its functional, discourse, and lexico-syntactic properties", from those in the working class.

Upper middle-class manners tend to require individuals to engage in conversational discourse with rather distant associates and to abstain from sharing excessive personal information. This contradicts working-class speech patterns, which often include frequent mentions of one's personal life. Further research also suggests that working-class parents emphasize conformity, traditional gender roles, and the adherence to external standards in their children, such as being neat and clean and "[believing] in strict leadership". This contrasted with professional-class households, where gender roles were more egalitarian and loosely defined. Upper middle class children were largely taught to adhere to internal standards, with curiosity, individuality, self-direction, and openness to new ideas being emphasized.

=== Lower middle class ===
US educational attainment from 1940 to 2015.

The lower middle class is the second most populous according to both Gilbert's as well as Thompson & Hickey's models, constituting roughly one third of the population, the same percentage as the working class. However, according to Henslin, who also divides the middle class into two sub-groups, the lower middle class is the most populous, constituting 34% of the population. In all three class models the lower middle class is said to consist of "semi-professionals" and lower level white collar employees. An adaptation by sociologists Brian K. William, Stacy C. Sawyer, and Carl M. Wahlstrom of Dennis Gilbert's class model gave the following description of the lower middle class:

The lower middle class... these are people in technical and lower-level management positions who work for those in the upper middle class as lower managers, craftspeople, and the like. They enjoy a reasonably comfortable standard of living, although it is constantly threatened by taxes and inflation. Generally, they have a Bachelor's and sometimes Master's college degree.

— Brian K. William, Stacy C. Sawyer and Carl M. Wahlstrom, Marriages, Families & Intimate Relationships, 2006 (Adapted from Dennis Gilbert 1997; and Joseph Kahl 1993)

Taking into account the percentages provided in the six-class model by Gilbert, as well as the model of Thompson and Hickey, one can apply U.S. Census Bureau statistics regarding income. According to these class models the lower middle class is located roughly between the 52nd and 84th percentile of society. In terms of personal income distribution in 2005, that would mean gross annual personal incomes from about $32,500 to $60,000.

As 42% of all households, and the majority of those in the top 40%, had two income earners, household income figures would be significantly higher, ranging from roughly $50,000 to $100,000 in 2005. In terms of educational attainment, 27% of persons had a bachelor's degree or higher.

=== Working class majority ===
Seen from a sociological perspective based on class-cleavages, the majority of Americans can be described as members of the working class.

The use of the term "working class" is applicable if the position of individuals, households and families in relation to the production of goods and services is the main determinant of social class. Class distinctions are seen in the distribution of individuals within society whose influence and importance differ. The nature of a person's work and the associated degrees of influence, responsibility, and complexity determine a person's social class. The higher the degree of influence and responsibility a person has or the more complex the work, the higher his or her status in society.

As qualified personnel become scarce for relatively important, responsible, and complex occupations, income increases, following the economic theory of scarcity resulting in value. According to this approach, occupation becomes more essential in determining class than income. Whereas professionals tend to create, conceptualize, consult and instruct, most Americans do not enjoy a high degree of independence in their work, as they merely follow set instructions.

Definitions of the working class are confusing. Defined in terms of income, they may be split into middle-middle or statistical middle class in order to speak to issues of class structure. Class models such as Dennis Gilbert or Thompson and Hickey estimate that roughly 53% of Americans are members of the working or lower classes.

Factors such as nature of work and lack of influence within their jobs lead some theorists to the conclusion that most Americans are working class. They have data that shows the majority of workers are not paid to share their ideas, are closely supervised, and do not enjoy independence in their jobs.

=== Weberian definition ===
Some modern theories of political economy consider a large middle class to be a beneficial and stabilizing influence on society because it has neither the possibly explosive revolutionary tendencies of the lower class, nor the absolutist tendencies of an entrenched upper class. Most sociological definitions of middle class follow Max Weber. Here, the middle class is defined as consisting of professionals or business owners who share a culture of domesticity and sub-urbanity and a level of relative security against social crisis in the form of socially desired skill or wealth. Thus, the theory on the middle class by Weber can be cited as one that supports the notion of the middle class being composed of a quasi-elite of professionals and managers, who are largely immune to economic downturns and trends such as out-sourcing which affect the statistical middle class.

== Income ==
Sociologists contend that middle class persons usually have above median incomes. As social classes lack clear boundaries and overlap there are no definite income thresholds as for what is considered middle class. In 2004, sociologist Leonard Beeghley identifies a male making $57,000 and a female making $40,000 with a combined households income of $97,000 as a typical American middle-class family. In 2005, sociologists William Thompson and Joseph Hickey estimate an income range of roughly $35,000 to $75,000 for the lower middle class and $100,000 or more for the upper middle class.

=== Size of middle class by income level ===
According to a 2021 Pew Research study that classifies adults as middle class if they belong to a household with income between 2/3 and 2x median household income ($52k-$156k for a household of three), the percentage of Americans in the middle class declined from 61% to 50% over the previous five decades (1971–2021) with 4% moving down into the lower class and 7% moving up into the upper class.

In 1996, one possible explanation for the increase in the higher earnings categories is that more households now have two wage earners.

=== Education and income ===
Educational attainment is one of the most prominent determinants of class status. Expertise is a necessary component of the capitalist market system, and is seen as one of the factors of production. Those with higher educational attainment tend to be positioned in occupations with greater autonomy, influence over the organizational process, and higher financial compensation. The following chart further explains the correlation between educational attainment and personal as well as household income.

Criteria		TOTAL	Less than 9th grade	9th to 12th grade (no diploma)	High School Graduate (includes equivalency)	Some College, No Degree	Associate Degree	Bachelor's Degree or More	Bachelor's Degree	Master's Degree	Professional Degree	Doctorate Degree
Median individual income	Male, age 25+	$46,680	$22,678	$23,649	$36,476	$42,379	$50,034	$74,161	$65,981	$85,600	$120,030	$100,658
Median individual income	Female, age 25+	$30,137	$12,735	$14,176	$21,133	$26,498	$30,957	$50,385	$43,951	$56,545	$77,868	$77,412

Source: U.S. Census Bureau, 2018

=== Household income controversy ===
Percentage distribution of 2+ income households among the quintiles

Household income is one of a household's attributes most commonly used to determine its class status but income may not always accurately reflect a household's position within society or the economy. Unlike personal income, household income does not reflect occupational achievement as much as it measures the number of income earners. Sociologist Dennis Gilbert acknowledges that a working-class household with two income earners may out-earn a single-income upper-middle-class household. Furthermore, household income fails to recognize household size. For example, a single attorney, earning $95,000, may have a higher standard of living than a family of four with an income of $120,000. Yet household income is still a commonly used class indicator.

The parade [of income earners with height representing income] suggest that [the] relationship between the distribution of income and the class structure is... blurred in the middle...we saw dual-income working class marchers looking down on single-income upper-middle-class marchers. In sum, the class structures as we have defined it...does not exactly match the distribution of household income.

— Dennis Gilbert, The American Class Structure, 1998

== Neighborhoods ==
A study by Brookings Institution in June 2006 revealed that Middle-income neighborhoods as a proportion of all metropolitan neighborhoods declined from 58 percent in 1970 to 41 percent in 2000. As housing costs increase, the middle class is squeezed and forced to live in less desirable areas making upward mobility more difficult. Safety, school systems, and even jobs are all linked to neighborhood types.

== Influence ==
The influence of the middle class depends on which theory one utilizes. If the middle class is defined as a modern bourgeoisie, the "middle class" has great influence. If middle class is used in a manner that includes all persons who are at neither extreme of the social strata, it might still be influential, as such definition may include the "professional middle class", which is then commonly referred to as the "upper middle class". Despite the fact that the professional (upper) middle class is a privileged minority, it is the perhaps the most influential class in the United States.

Most ideas that find their way into the cultural mainstream... are crafted by a relative elite: people who are well educated, reasonably well-paid, and who overlap, socially and through family ties, with at least the middling levels of the business community—in short, the professional middle class.

— Barbara Ehrenreich

Several reasons can be cited as to why the professional middle class is so influential. One is that journalists, commentators, writers, professors, economists, and political scientists, who are essential in shaping public opinion, are almost exclusively members of the professional middle class. Considering the overwhelming presence of professional middle-class persons in post secondary education, another essential instrument in regards to shaping public opinion, it should come as no surprise that the lifestyle exclusive to this quasi-elite has become indicative of the American mainstream itself. In addition to setting trends, the professional middle class also holds occupations which include managerial duties, meaning that middle-class professionals spend much of their work-life directing others and conceptualizing the workday for the average worker.

Yet another reason is the economic clout generated by this class. In 2005 according to U.S. Census statistics, the top third of society, excluding the top 5%, controlled the largest share of income in the United States. Although some in the statistical middle class (for example, police officers and fire fighters in the more affluent suburbs in the San Francisco Bay Area) may have lifestyles as comfortable as those found among the ranks of the professional middle class, only few have the same degree of autonomy and influence over society as those in the professional middle class. Other white-collar members of the statistical middle class may not only be unable to afford the middle-class lifestyle but also lack the influence found in the professional middle class.

== Typical occupations ==
Due to the many different ways of sub-dividing the middle class, some occupations indicative of the professional middle class might be categorized as upper-middle or lower-middle. Typical occupations for members of the middle class are those identified as being part of "the professions" and often include managerial duties as well, with all being white collar: accountants, tenured professors, psychologists, physicians, engineers, lawyers, commissioned military officers, architects, journalists, mid-level corporate managers, writers, economists, political scientists, urban planners, financial managers, registered nurses (RNs), pharmacists, and analysts.

Autonomy is often seen as one of the greatest measurements of a person's class status. Even though some working class employees might also enjoy largely self-directed work, large degrees of autonomy in the work place, as well as influence over the organizational process, which are commonly the results of obtained expertise, these can still be seen as hallmarks of upper-middle-class or professional-middle-class professions.

As for the lower middle class, other less prestigious occupations, many sales positions, entry-level management, secretaries, etc., would be included. In addition to professionals whose work is largely self-directed and includes managerial duties, many other less privileged members of the statistical middle class would find themselves in semi-independent to independent white collar positions. Many of those in the statistical middle class might work in what are called the professional support fields. These fields include occupations such as dental hygienists, and other professional and sales support.

== Academic models ==
Note that these models are from the 2000s, and are not adjusted for inflation.

Academic class models
Dennis Gilbert, 2002		William Thompson & Joseph Hickey, 2005		Leonard Beeghley, 2004	
Class	Typical characteristics	Class	Typical characteristics	Class	Typical characteristics
Capitalist class (1%)	Top-level executives, high-rung politicians, heirs. Ivy League education common.	Upper class (1%)	Top-level executives, celebrities, heirs; income of $500,000+ common. Ivy League education common.	The super-rich (0.9%)	Multi-millionaires whose incomes commonly exceed $3.5 million or more; includes celebrities and powerful executives/politicians. Ivy League education common.
Upper middle class^{[1]} (15%)	Highly-educated (often with graduate degrees), most commonly salaried, professionals and middle management with large work autonomy.	Upper middle class^{[1]} (15%)	Highly-educated (often with graduate degrees) professionals & managers with household incomes varying from the high 5-figure range to commonly above $100,000.	The rich (5%)	Households with net worth of $1 million or more; largely in the form of home equity. Generally have college degrees.
Upper middle class^{[1]} (15%)	Highly-educated (often with graduate degrees), most commonly salaried, professionals and middle management with large work autonomy.	Upper middle class^{[1]} (15%)	Highly-educated (often with graduate degrees) professionals & managers with household incomes varying from the high 5-figure range to commonly above $100,000.	Middle class (plurality/ majority?; ca. 46%)	College-educated workers with considerably higher-than-average incomes and compensation; a man making $57,000 and a woman making $40,000 may be typical.
Lower middle class (30%)	Semi-professionals and craftsmen with a roughly average standard of living. Most have some college education and are white-collar.	Lower middle class (32%)	Semi-professionals and craftsmen with some work autonomy; household incomes commonly range from $35,000 to $75,000. Typically, some college education.	Middle class (plurality/ majority?; ca. 46%)	College-educated workers with considerably higher-than-average incomes and compensation; a man making $57,000 and a woman making $40,000 may be typical.
Working class (30%)	Clerical and most blue-collar workers whose work is highly routinized. Standard of living varies depending on number of income earners, but is commonly just adequate. High school education.	Lower middle class (32%)	Semi-professionals and craftsmen with some work autonomy; household incomes commonly range from $35,000 to $75,000. Typically, some college education.	Middle class (plurality/ majority?; ca. 46%)	College-educated workers with considerably higher-than-average incomes and compensation; a man making $57,000 and a woman making $40,000 may be typical.
Working class (30%)	Clerical and most blue-collar workers whose work is highly routinized. Standard of living varies depending on number of income earners, but is commonly just adequate. High school education.	Working class (32%)	Clerical, pink- and blue-collar workers with often low job security; common household incomes range from $16,000 to $30,000. High school education.	Working class (ca. 40–45%)	Blue-collar workers and those whose jobs are highly routinized with low economic security; a man making $40,000 and a woman making $26,000 may be typical. High school education.
Working poor (13%)	Service, low-rung clerical and some blue-collar workers. High economic insecurity and risk of poverty. Some high school education.	Working class (32%)	Clerical, pink- and blue-collar workers with often low job security; common household incomes range from $16,000 to $30,000. High school education.	Working class (ca. 40–45%)	Blue-collar workers and those whose jobs are highly routinized with low economic security; a man making $40,000 and a woman making $26,000 may be typical. High school education.
Working poor (13%)	Service, low-rung clerical and some blue-collar workers. High economic insecurity and risk of poverty. Some high school education.	Lower class (ca. 14–20%)	Those who occupy poorly-paid positions or rely on government transfers. Some high school education.	Working class (ca. 40–45%)	Blue-collar workers and those whose jobs are highly routinized with low economic security; a man making $40,000 and a woman making $26,000 may be typical. High school education.
Underclass (12%)	Those with limited or no participation in the labor force. Reliant on government transfers. Some high school education.	Lower class (ca. 14–20%)	Those who occupy poorly-paid positions or rely on government transfers. Some high school education.	The poor (ca. 12%)	Those living below the poverty line with limited to no participation in the labor force; a household income of $18,000 may be typical. Some high school education.
References: Gilbert, D. (2002) The American Class Structure: In An Age of Growing Inequality. Belmont, CA: Wadsworth, ISBN 0534541100. Thompson, W. & Hickey, J. (2005). Society in Focus. Boston, MA: Pearson, Allyn & Bacon; Beeghley, L. (2004). The Structure of Social Stratification in the United States. Boston, MA: Pearson, Allyn & Bacon.^{1} The upper middle class may also be referred to as "Professional class" Ehrenreich, B. (1989). The Inner Life of the Middle Class. NY, NY: Harper-Collins.

== See also ==
- African-American middle class
- American Dream
- Income inequality in the United States
- Middle-class squeeze
- Plain Folk of the Old South
- Upper middle class in the United States
- Class: A Guide Through the American Status System
- Mexican-American middle class

== Bibliography ==
- Baritz, Loren. The Good Life: The Meaning of Success for the American Middle Class (1989)
- Beckert, Sven, and Julia B. Rosenbaum, eds. The American Bourgeoisie: Distinction and Identity in the Nineteenth Century (Palgrave Macmillan; 2011) 284 pages; Scholarly studies on the habits, manners, networks, institutions, and public roles of the American middle class with a focus on cities in the North.
- Blau, Peter & Duncan Otis D.; The American Occupational Structure (1967) classic study of structure and mobility
- Curwood, Anastasia C. ed. Stormy Weather: Middle-Class African American Marriages Between the Two World Wars (University of North Carolina Press; 2011) 240 pages; explores the public and private views of upwardly mobile African-Americans between 1918 and 1942.
- Fussell, Paul; Class (a painfully accurate guide through the American status system), (1983) (ISBN 0-345-31816-1)
- Grusky, David B. ed.; Social Stratification: Class, Race, and Gender in Sociological Perspective (2001) scholarly articles
- Hart, Emma, "Work, Family, and the Eighteenth-Century History of a Middle Class in the American South," Journal of Southern History, 78 (2012), 551–78.
- Hazelrigg, Lawrence E. & Lopreato, Joseph; Class, Conflict, and Mobility: Theories and Studies of Class Structure (1972).
- Hoberek, Andrew. The Twilight of the Middle Class: Post-World War II American Fiction and White-Collar Work (2005)
- Huffington, Arianna. Third World America: How our politicians are abandoning the middle class and betraying the American dream (Broadway Books, 2011).
- Hyman, Louis. Borrow: The American way of debt (Vintage, 2012); argues that personal credit created the American Middle Class and almost bankrupted the nation.
- Hymowitz, Kay; Marriage and Caste in America: Separate and Unequal Families in a Post-Marital Age (2006) ISBN 1-56663-709-0
- Jackson, Brenda K. Domesticating the West: The Re-creation of the Nineteenth-century American Middle Class (U of Nebraska Press, 2005).
- Lamont, Michèle. Money, morals, and manners: The culture of the French and the American upper-middle class (U of Chicago Press, 1992).
- McComb, Mary C. Great Depression and the Middle Class: Experts, Collegiate Youth and Business Ideology, 1929-1941 (Routledge, 2013).
- Mills, C. Wright. White Collar: the American Middle Classes, (Oxford University Press, 1956).
- Newman, Katherine S. Falling from grace: The experience of downward mobility in the American middle class (Free Press, 1988).
- Pearson, Joseph W. The Whigs' America: Middle-Class Political Thought in the Age of Jackson and Clay (University Press of Kentucky, 2020).
- Quart, Alissa (2018). Squeezed: Why Our Families Can't Afford America. Ecco Press. ISBN 978-0062412256.
- Reeves, Richard V. Dream hoarders: How the American upper middle class is leaving everyone else in the dust, why that is a problem, and what to do about it (Brookings Institution Press, 2018) online.
- Temin, Peter (2017). The Vanishing Middle Class: Prejudice and Power in a Dual Economy. MIT Press. ISBN 9780262036160.
- Ware, Leland, and Theodore J. Davis, "Ordinary People in an Extraordinary Time: The Black Middle-Class in the Age of Obama," Howard Law Journal, 55 (Winter 2012), 533–74.
- Webb, Sheila. "The Consumer-Citizen: 'Life' Magazine's Construction of a Middle-Class Lifestyle Through Consumption Scenarios." Studies in Popular Culture 34.2 (2012): 23–47. online
- Whitaker, Jan. Service and style: How the American department store fashioned the middle class (Macmillan, 2006).
- Whyte, William H. The Organization Man (1956), a famous classic
- Zussman, Robert. Mechanics of the middle class (U of California Press, 2020).

=== News articles ===
- The American Middle Class Is No Longer the World's Richest. The New York Times. April 22, 2014.
- Middle Class Shrinks Further as More Fall Out Instead of Climbing Up. The New York Times. January 25, 2015.
- Middle-Class Betrayal? Why Working Hard Is No Longer Enough in America. NBC News.
- Why the U.S. Could Soon Be the World's First Former Middle Class Society. Joseph Stiglitz for The Huffington Post. December 9, 2015.
- Is shrinking the middle class a good thing? Al Jazeera America.
- Are you in the American middle class? Find out with our income calculator May 11, 2016
- Are You Middle Class?
- No more middle ground: Politics have been getting more extreme as the middle class shrinks. Vice. August 25, 2017
- Families Go Deep in Debt to Stay in the Middle Class. The Wall Street Journal. August 1, 2019
