= Leonard Beeghley =

American sociologist

Dr. Leonard Beeghley
- Born: December 14, 1946 (age 79)
- Education: University of California, Riverside
- Scientific career
- Fields: Sociology
- Workplaces: University of Florida

Leonard Beeghley (born December 14, 1946) is Professor Emeritus of sociology at the University of Florida since 1975. He received his Ph.D. from the University of California at Riverside in 1975 and has since published seven books over the course of his career. Two of these seven books, The Emergence of Sociological Theory and The Structure of Social Stratification in the United States "become standard references in the field." His interests include the relationships between social stratification, public policy and societal problems. He has been covering the socio-economic class structure of the United States in five volumes since 1978.

== List of publications ==
Since 1978, Leonard Beegley has published the following books according to Amazon.com:

- Structure of Social Stratification in the United States (5th Edition), 2007
- The Emergence of Sociological Theory, 2006
- Structure of Social Stratification in the United States (4th Edition), 2004
- Homicide: A Sociological Explanation, 2003
- Angles of Vision: How to Understand Social Problems, 1998
- What Does Your Wife Do?: Gender and the Transformation of Family Life, 1996
- Structure of Social Stratification in the United States (3rd Edition), 1995
- Structure of Social Stratification in the United States (2nd Edition), 1989
- Living Poorly in America, 1983
- Social Stratification in America, 1978

== See also ==
- Sociology
- Social class in the United States
