= Social class in American history =

Social class is an important theme for historians of the United States for decades. The subject touches on many other elements of American history such as that of changing U.S. education, with greater education attainment leading to expanding household incomes for many social groups. The overall level of prosperity grew greatly in the U.S. through the 20th century as well as the 21st century, anchored in changes such as growing American advances in science and technology with American inventions such as the phonograph, the portable electric vacuum cleaner, and so on. Yet much of the debate has focused lately on whether social mobility has fallen in recent decades as income inequality has risen, what scholars such as Katherine S. Newman have called the "American nightmare."

For most of American history, social class barriers were fundamentally rigid, with various private and public institutions enforcing rules based on racial segregation and other forms of classifying people based on prejudices such as antisemitism and Hispanophobia. All this changed greatly with the rise of broad-based prosperity in the aftermath of World War II and efforts to expand Constitutional civil rights under the law to groups such as African-Americans and Hispanic-Americans. Issues regarding social class have remained hot-button topics in U.S. politics, with the American Great Recession causing massive socio-economic harm across the country from southerners to northerners to working-class whites to middle-class blacks

== Colonial period ==
Historians in recent decades have explored in microscopic detail the process of settling the new country and creating the social structure.

=== Southern colonies ===
The main themes have been the class system of the plantation South. These include the plantation masters and their families, as typified by the Byrd family. The plantation elite in gen regions of the Chesapeake, with some attention to South Carolina as well. The region had very few urban places apart from Charleston, where a merchant elite maintained close connections with nearby plantation society. It was a goal of prosperous merchants, lawyers and doctors in Charleston to buy lands and retire as country gentlemen. Charleston supported diverse ethnic groups, including Germans and French, as well as a free black population. Beyond the plantations yeoman farmers operated small holdings, sometimes with a slave or two. Missionaries commented on their lack of religiosity. The plantation areas of Virginia were integrated into the vestry system of the established Anglican church. By the 1760s a strong tendency to emulate British society was apparent in the plantation regions. However the growing strength of republicanism created a political ethos that resisted imperial taxation without local consent. Led by Virginia, the Southern Colonies resisted the British policy of taxation without representation, and supported the American Revolution, sending wealthy planters such as George Washington to lead the armies and Thomas Jefferson to declare the principles of independence, as well as thousands of ordinary folk to man the armies.

== 19th century ==
=== New England ===
New England was settled by community groups, that transplanted their social structure from England. In New England there was a flattening--owning land was a reality for most families, and the system of powerful landlords that pervaded English rural life was not carried over. There was no aristocracy. The strong religious base of the Puritans made the social order revolve around the local Congregational church. Education was a high priority; Harvard College was founded in 1636 and provided most of the ministers and lawyers. By 1700 a rich merchant class grew up in Boston, Salem and other seaports, linking the local economy to the entire British Empire. By 1750 land shortages were causing problems, as Yankees began expanding north into Maine and New Hampshire, and west into New York.

=== Frontier ===
Historian Frederick Jackson Turner had a frontier based theory. The frontier itself was egalitarian as land ownership was available to all free men. Second deference faded away as frontiersmen treated each other as equals. Third the frontiersmen forced new levels of political equality through Jefferson Democracy and Jacksonian Democracy. Finally the frontier provided a safety valve whereby discontented easterners could find their own lands. Historians now agree that few Eastern city people went to the frontier, but many farmers did so; before 1850 the America had few cities, which were mostly small, and the vast majority of people were rural. According to the Turner model, the social structure of the East was similar to the familiar European class-based structure, while the West increasingly became more socially, politically, and economically equal.

=== The Plain Folk of the South ===
Frank Lawrence Owsley in Plain Folk of the Old South (1949) redefined the debate by starting with the writings of Daniel R. Hundley who in 1860 had defined the Southern middle class as "farmers, planters, traders, storekeepers, artisans, mechanics, a few manufacturers, a goodly number of country school teachers, and a host of half-fledged country lawyers, doctors, parsons, and the like." To find these people Owsley turned to the name-by-name files on the manuscript federal census. Owsley argued that Southern society was not dominated by planter aristocrats, but that yeoman farmers played a significant role in it. The religion, language, and culture of these common people created a democratic "plain folk" society.

In his study of Edgefield County, South Carolina, Orville Vernon Burton classified black society into the poor, the yeoman middle class, and the elite. A clear line demarcated the elite, but according to Burton, the line between poor and yeoman was never very distinct. Stephanie McCurry argues, yeomen were clearly distinguished from poor whites by their ownership of land (real property). Yeomen were "self-working farmers," distinct from the elite because they worked their land themselves alongside any slaves they owned. Ownership of large numbers of slaves made the work of planters completely managerial.

=== Minorities ===
==== African Americans ====
The study of slavery as a social and economic system dates from Ulrich B. Phillips in the early 20th century. He argued that plantation slavery was a school for civilizing the blacks, albeit one that produced no graduates. His favoritism toward the slave owners was finally challenged by neoabolitionist historians in the 1950s, most notably Kenneth Stampp. Since the 1960s a large literature has emerged on the social structure of the slave system, especially on such topics as family life, gender roles, resistance to slavery, and demographic trends. The study of free blacks has been slower to emerge because of the shortage of records, but historians have been filling in the picture North and South with studies of free black urban communities, and their religious and political leaders.

The post-slavery era has been dominated by political studies, especially of Reconstruction and Jim Crow. The black churches were not only a political force, but became central to the black community in both urban and rural areas. The emergence of a black musical culture has been linked both to slavery (as in the Blues), and to church music.

==== Asian Americans ====
Asian Americans had small communities in New York City before 1860. Their greatest growth came on the Pacific Coast, during the Gold Rush and railroad booms of the 1860s. The Chinese who remained in America were violently driven out of the mining and railroad camps, and largely forced into Chinatowns in the larger cities, especially San Francisco. The Chinese exclusion laws of the 1880s created special legal problems, which numerous have explored. The Chinatowns were over 90% male, augmented by a trickle of immigration, and slowly shrank in size until 1940. Local and national attitudes became much more favorable to the Chinese after 1940, largely because of American support for China in World War II.

Japanese immigration was a major factor in the history of Hawaii, and after its annexation in 1898 large numbers moved to the West Coast. Anti-Japanese hostility was strong down to 1941, when it intensified and most Japanese on the West Coast were sent to relocation camps, 1942–44. After 1945 the trickle of immigration from the Philippines, India and Korea grew steadily, creating large communities on the West Coast. Asian immigration grew rapidly after 1965, with a large community that has very high educational achievement levels and high incomes.

==== Hispanics ====
In 1848 after the Mexican–American War, the annexation of Texas and the Southwest introduced a Hispanic population that had full citizenship status. About 10,000 Californios lived in the southern part of California, and were numerically overwhelmed by migrants form the East by 1900 that their identity was almost lost. In New Mexico, by contrast, the Mexican population maintained its highly traditionalistic and religious culture, and retained some political power, into the 21st century. The Tejano population of Texas supported the revolution against Mexico in 1836, and gained full citizenship. In practice, however, most were ranch hands with limited political rights under the control of local bosses.

=== Industrial Northeast ===
The industrialization of the Northeast dramatically changed the social structure. New wealth abounded, with the growth of factories, railroads, and banks from the 1830 to the 1920s. Hundreds of small cities sprang up, together with 100 large cities (of 100,000 or more population by 1920). Most had a base in manufacturing. The urban areas came to have a complex class structure, compounded of wealth (the more the better), occupation (with the learned professions at the top), and family status (the older the better). Ethnic-religious groups had their separate social systems (such as German Lutherans and Irish Catholics). The New England Yankee was dominant in business, finance, education, and high society in most Northern cities, but gradually lost control of politics to a working class coalition led dominated by bosses and immigrants, including Irish Catholics. Hundreds of new colleges and academies were founded to support the system, usually with specific religious or ethnic identities. Heterogeneous state universities became important after 1920.

=== Ethnicity and social class ===
The most elaborate and in-depth studies of social class have focused on the working class, especially regarding occupation, immigration, ethnicity, family structure, education, occupational mobility, religious behavior, and neighborhood structure. Before 1970, historians emphasized the success and the painful processes of assimilation into American culture, as studied by Oscar Handlin. In recent decades the internal value systems have been explored, as well as the process of occupational mobility. Most of the studies have been localized (because of the need for the exhaustive use of censuses and local data) so that generalizations have been difficult to make. In recent years European scholars have become interested in the international flows so that there are now studies following people from Europe to America over their lifetimes.

Labor historians have moved from a focus on national labor unions to microscopic studies of the workers in particular industries in particular cities. The consensus has been that the workers had their own political and cultural value system. The political values were based on a producer's ethic, that is the working class was the truly productive sector of society, and expressed a version of republicanism that was similar to the middle class version. This enabled the businessman's party, the Republican party, to enjoy a strong base among Protestant blue collar workers, and prevented the emergence of a strong Socialist movement.

== 20th century ==
The Progressive Era, with its emphasis on factualism and scientific inquiry produced hundreds of community studies, mostly using descriptive statistics to cover issues of poverty, crime, migration, religiosity, education, and public health. The emergence of systematic social science, especially sociology, shifted the center of class studies into sociology departments. The most representative example was the Middletown books by Robert Lynd and Helen Lynd, which gave a microscopic look at class structures in a typical small city (Muncie, Indiana). After 1960 localized studies gave way to national surveys, with special emphasis on the process of social mobility and stratification.

A classic theme was trying to see if the middle class was shrinking, or if the opportunities for upward mobility had worsened over time. After 1960 a growing concern with education led to many studies dealing with racial integration, and performance in schools by racial and gender groupings.

The disposable income of the American upper class was sharply reduced by high income tax rates during the 1930s, 40s, and 50s. During this period corporate executives had relatively modest incomes, lived modestly, and had few servants.

=== In popular culture ===
The existence of class differences in American society has long been the focus of popular culture, whether in the form of books, films, or plays. Social class, for example, is a theme used in the 1948 production Mister Roberts, in a scene where the ship's captain displays resentment toward the title character, contrasting his own impoverished background to that of Roberts himself:

I think you're a pretty smart boy. I may not talk very good, Mister, but I know how to take care of smart boys. Let me tell you something. Let me tell you a little secret. I hate your guts, you college son-of-a-****! You think you're better than I am! You think you're better because you've had everything handed to you. Let me tell you something, Mister – I've worked since I was ten years old, and all my life I've known you superior bastards. I knew you people when I was a kid in Boston and I worked in eating-places and you ordered me around ... "Oh bus-boy! My friend here seems to have thrown up on the table. Clean it up, please!" I started going to sea as a steward and I worked for you then ... "Steward, take my magazine out to the deck chair!" ... "Steward, I don't like your looks. Please keep out of my way as much as possible!" Well, I took that crap! I took that for years from pimple-faced bastards who weren't good enough to wipe my nose! And now I don't have to take it any more! There's a war on, by God, and I'm the Captain and you can wipe my nose! The worst thing I can do to you is to keep you on this ship! And that's where you're going to stay! Now get out of here.

== Agriculture ==
=== Farm workers ===
Before industrialization, "yeoman farmers"—self-sufficient, politically independent landowners—made up a large portion of the country's population. Jeffersonian democracy and Jacksonian democracy successfully expanded the political rights of the yeomen, and the geographical extent of the nation to provide them farms. This culminated in the Homestead Act of 1862 which provided hundreds of thousands of free farms. Before 1865 large southern plantations used slaves. After emancipation, a system of sharecropping and tenant farming for both whites and blacks in the South provided a semi-independent status for farmers who did not own their land. In contemporary times, migrant agricultural workers—mostly Mexicans—perform field and packing work.

=== Agriculture in the 21st century ===
Only 0.7% of the population of the United States is employed in the agricultural sector as of 2007. Most are proprietors of independent farms. Once the dominant American social class, this group diminished in overall numbers during the 20th century, as farm holdings grew more consolidated, farming operations became more mechanized, and most of the population migrated to urban areas.

Today, the agricultural sector has essentially taken on the characteristics of business and industry generally. In contemporary usage, a "farmer" is someone who owns and operates a farm, which more often than not will be a sizable business enterprise; "agricultural workers" or "farm workers", who perform the actual work associated with farming, typically come out of the lower classes; indeed, they are often near-destitute immigrants or migrant farm workers. In this respect, farming mirrors big business: like any enterprise, a farm has owners (who may be a family or a corporation), salaried managers, supervisors, foremen and workers.

With the number of farms steadily diminishing, the stereotypical humble homestead is increasingly the exception, for viable farming now means agribusiness; the large amounts of capital required to operate a competitive farm require large-scale organization. The large landowners in California's Central Valley, Coachella Valley and Imperial Valley fall squarely within the upper class. Among farmers, "income" in the conventional sense is not an accurate standard of wealth measurement, because farmers typically keep their official income low by placing their assets into farming corporations rather than drawing the money directly. The stereotypical poor, marginal farmer "eking out a living" from the soil, an image deeply ingrained in most Americans' minds by folklore, films, and even history texts, has now been largely displaced by agribusiness, which has bought them out and consolidated their holdings.

== See also ==
- American Dream
- California Dream
- American middle class
- American upper class
- Social history
