= Job control (workplace) =

Employment concept

Job control is a person's ability to influence what happens in their work environment, in particular to influence matters that are relevant to their personal goals. Job control may include control over work tasks, control over the work pace and physical movement, control over the social and technical environment, and freedom from supervision.

Workplace autonomy has been seen as a specialized form of the more general concept of control. Workplace autonomy is the freedom of a person to determine what they do at work, and how.

== Association with other factors ==
For Georges Friedmann, the quality of work depends on the employees' skills and on their capacity to control decision-making at work.

Robert Blauner found that job control is closely linked with occupational prestige and job satisfaction. Job satisfaction and job control tend to be higher for managerial and professional workers than for unskilled workers.

A meta-analysis of 1986 found an association of high levels of perceived control with "high levels of job satisfaction […], commitment, involvement, performance and motivation, and low levels of physical symptoms, emotional distress, role stress, absenteeism, intent to turnover, and turnover". Similarly, within the job demands–resources model it is assumed that resources such as job control counterbalance job strain and to contribute to motivation. In support of this approach, results of a 2003 study suggest that "as job demands increase, high job control is needed to limit fatigue, whereas either high job control or high job social support is needed to enhance intrinsic work motivation".

Increasing job control is an intervention shown to help counteract exhaustion and cynicism in the workplace, which are two symptoms of occupational burnout.

Job control has also been linked to the meaningfulness and the manageability components of salutogenesis.

== See also ==
- Profession § Status and prestige
- Empowerment § In workplace management
- Balanced job complex
- Employee engagement
- Employee monitoring
- Equality of autonomy
- Flexibility (personality)#Work environment
- Occupational health psychology#Demand-control-support model
- Occupational stress § Status
- Quality of working life § Measurement
- Responsible autonomy
- Workers' control
- Workers' self-management
- Workplace democracy
