= Jock Tamson's bairns =

Scots phrase

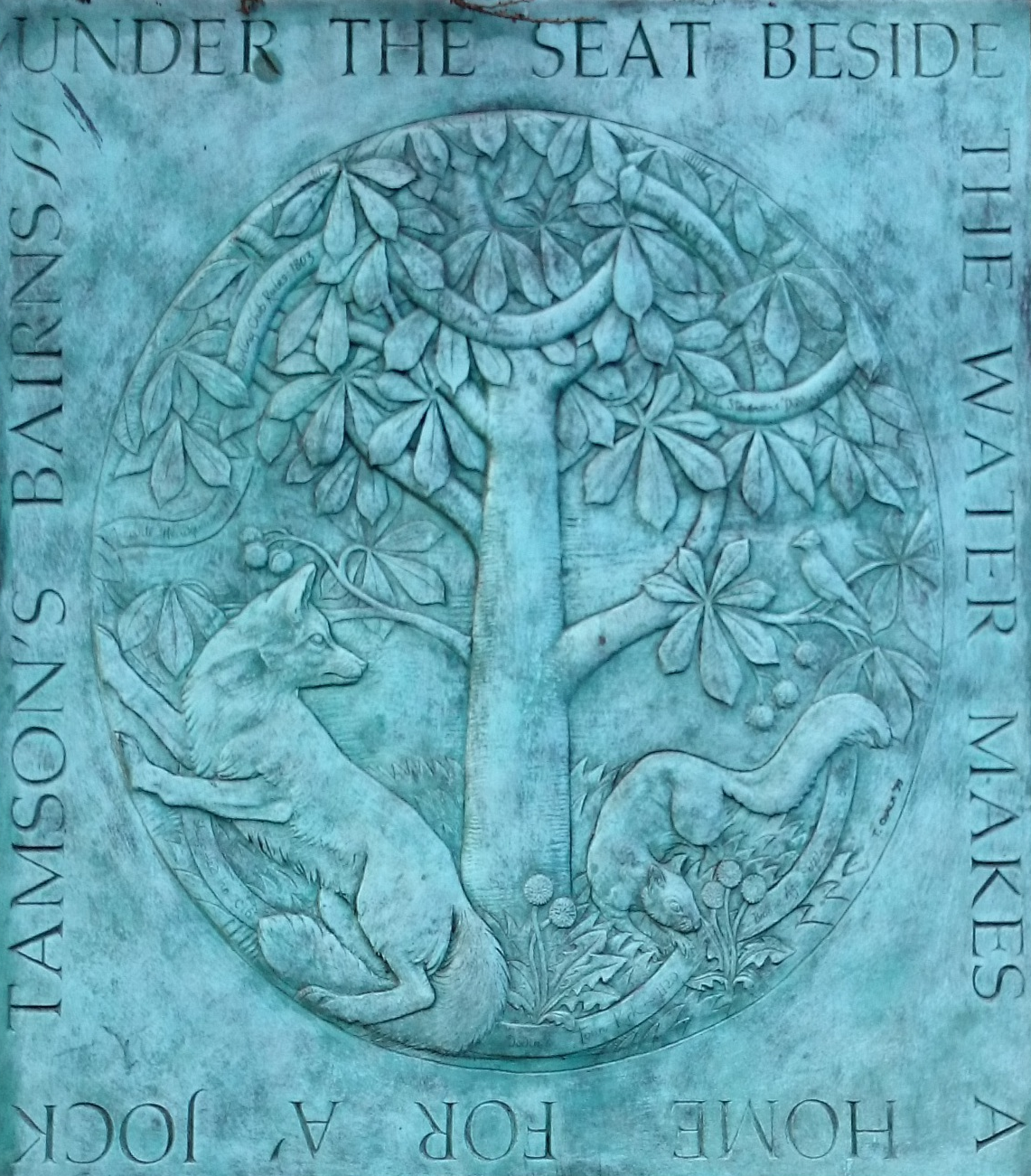
A copper plaque by Duddingston Kirk, Edinburgh, Scotland. The Kirk is situated below Arthur's Seat and next to Duddingston Loch.

"Jock Tamson's bairns" is a Scots (and Northumbrian English) dialect version of "Jack (John) Thomson's children" but both Jock and Tamson in this context take on the connotation of everyman. The Dictionary of the Scots Language gives the following definitions:

- Jock: (1) A generic term for a man, a male person. (34) Jock Tamson's bairns: the human race, common humanity; also, with less universal force, a group of people united by a common sentiment, interest or purpose.
- Tamson: a Scottish form of the surname Thomson. In phrases Tamson stands for the ordinary representative man in the street: Jock Tamson's bairns, common humanity.

The phrase was common in conversation and general culture in Scotland, but is no longer so widespread. Some examples are: the play of that name by Liz Lochhead; a folk music group of that name; the title of a book describing the official records of the Scottish nation; parliamentary speeches by Winnie Ewing and Patrick Harvie. In a seminar, Morag Alexander, the Scottish Commissioner of the Equality and Human Rights Commission (EHRC), mentioned "a Scottish consensus that we are all 'Jock Tamson's bairns'" but noted that a significant proportion of Scots are more concerned about immigration affecting Scotland's identity than that consensus would suggest.

The phrase more often occurs in an extended form: We're aw Jock Tamson's bairns. This is interpreted in a metaphorical sense as a statement of egalitarian sentiments equivalent to "we're all the same under the skin" or "we are all God's children".

The origin of the phrase is uncertain. The earliest reference quoted in the Dictionary of the Scots Language is from 1847, where it describes the phrase as "an expression of mutual good fellowship very frequently heard in Scotland." One suggestion is that it was simply common usage in the Fife town of Buckhaven, which had 70 Thomson families out of a total of 160 families in 1833. Another is that the Reverend John Thomson, minister of Duddingston Kirk, Edinburgh, from 1805 to 1840, called the members of his congregation (and his many children) "ma bairns". The latter saying may well be the reason for the location of the plaque illustrated above.

== See also ==
- Placeholder word
- Placeholder name
  - List of placeholder names
  - List of English-language placeholder names for people
  - Alice and Bob
- Metasyntactic variable
- Everyman
- Commoner
- Lorem ipsum
- Fictional company
- Fictional brand
- Evil corporation
- Independent Studio Services § Fictional brands
- Dummy pronoun
- Nonce word
- Expletive attributive
