= Fictional brand =

Fictional product, created for movies or TV

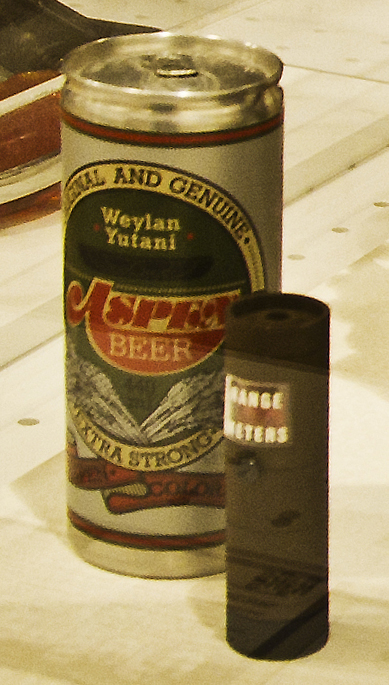
Aspen beer, a fictional brand from the 1979 film Alien

A fictional brand is a nonexistent brand depicted in media, such as books, comics, films, music, television shows, or video games. Fictional brands may be designed to imitate or satirize a real corporate brand.

Permission is typically sought before using trademarked brands in media to avoid legal proceedings. Fictional brands can overcome situations where the creators do not want to pay for permission, where a trademark owner is unwilling to approve the use of their brand, or where the product is shown in a negative light. For example, the 1994 remake of Miracle on 34th Street used the fictional department store C.F. Cole's in the film, after Macy's declined to have one of their department stores filmed in the remake. Historically, many movie studios also avoided existing brands to make the films more escapist and to avoid taking attention away from star performers. Paid product placement has gradually become more frequent as it became a lucrative part of the film industry.

More recently, fictional brands have been used for commercial purposes through the process of reverse product placement. Consumer attachment to those brands in the fictional world may be leveraged through "defictionalisation" or "productisation" in the real world. It has been suggested that the fictional brands represent brand potential rather than brand reality; they are in effect, “protobrands” that can be leveraged and transformed into registered trademarks which can derive revenue for their owners through reverse product placement or, more accurately, reverse brand placement. Examples include Harry Potter's Bertie Bott's Every Flavour Beans, now available as real candy manufactured by the Jelly Belly Company; Duff Beer, a beer brand now available for consumption in Europe which initially appeared in The Simpsons; and Staples' Dunder Mifflin paper, from the TV show The Office.

== Purposes ==
Using a trademarked product in fictional media can result in allegations of trademark dilution. Trademark dilution can occur when a brand is portrayed in a way that tarnishes or confuses the image of the brand, even when there is no competing product. For example, Pussycat Cinema was blocked from showing the pornographic film Debbie Does Dallas, as the lead actress Bambi Woods performed sexual acts in an outfit similar to those worn by the Dallas Cowboys cheerleaders. Judge Ellsworth Van Graafeiland commented, "it is hard to believe that anyone who had seen defendants’ sexually depraved film could ever thereafter disassociate it from plaintiff’s cheerleaders."

Many movies and television shows opt to use prominent but nonexistent brands. Some are tied to specific fictional universes, like the Big Kahuna Burger fast food restaurants in Quentin Tarantino's films, but many appear in unrelated properties. For example, the fictional cigarette brand Morley was created when tobacco advertising was widespread in film and television, before the Public Health Cigarette Smoking Act and Tobacco Master Settlement Agreement banned cigarette advertising in television, radio, and film. Films that did not receive sponsorship from a cigarette brand might use a fictional brand like Morley. They first appeared in Alfred Hitchcock's Psycho, and have since been used in many films and shows including The Twilight Zone, Naked City, The Dick Van Dyke Show, Friends, Perry Mason, Curb Your Enthusiasm, The X-Files, and Mission: Impossible.

Fictional brands offer more realism than unbranded objects because they have packaging, logos, and aesthetic designs similar to real-world products. The most well-known fictional brands, like Wonka Bars, have brand recognition comparable to actual products. The demand for Duff Beer was so high that multiple breweries sold "Duff" beers until legally blocked by Fox Broadcasting Company. Fox partnered with breweries to sell Duff beer in markets that did not have strong protection for fictional products, starting in Chile and later expanding into other parts of South America and Europe.

Trademarks have been granted to prominent fictional brands. Trademark protection has its origin in establishing signifiers that link products to their manufacturers. The mark allows a consumer to distinguish high-quality products from reputable manufacturers. In the United States, court rulings in the 1980s extended trademark protection of fiction to cover characters, settings, and objects from the fictional universe. This allowed a trademark to cover products and services that are not available to real customers. For example, a restaurateur filed for a trademark on and attempted to open "THE KRUSTY KRAB" seafood restaurants in California in 2014. Viacom sued, and in 2017, the Southern District of Texas ruled that the restaurant would violate Viacom's trademarks for SpongeBob SquarePants, even though Viacom only ever planned to depict a fictional Krusty Krab and had no plans to open a physical restaurant.

Some films and shows incorporate brands as "characters" in the story. The quirky brands of Tarantino's films are juxtaposed with scenes of extreme violence. Set decorator Sandy Reynolds-Wasco says that an object like Tarantino's Red Apple Cigarettes, with its prominent grinning worm emerging from an apple, can "soften the characters, even among the incredibly bloody scenes". In the HBO series Succession, the fictional family business "Waystar" is used to characterize the Roy family who run it. The science fiction series Severance introduces the fictional "Lumon" brand and intentionally presents it in a negative light, as cold and dystopian.

== Well-known fictional brands ==
=== ACME ===
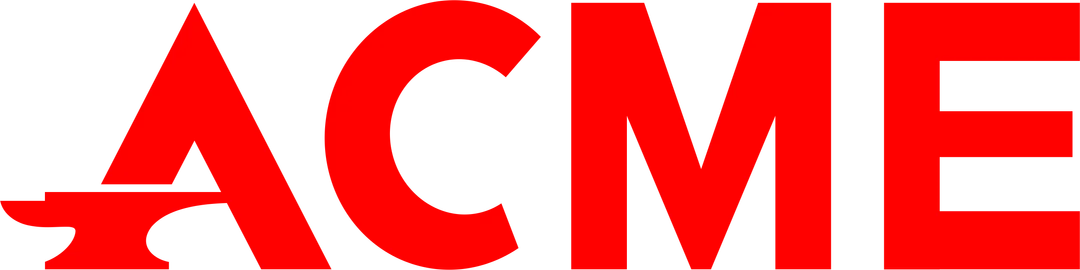
Acme logo

The Acme Corporation is a fictional manufacturer of a vast range of products. The Acme products first appeared in silent films, but are most associated with cartoons, especially those of Warner Bros. There are many backronyms to explain the word, but Acme is Greek for "zenith" or "peak". During the Second Industrial Revolution, "Acme" was used as a brand name for many mass-produced consumer goods, in part for the benefit of appearing at the front of alphabetical listings like a telephone directory or mail order catalog. Acme products are known to fail in outlandish ways that result in cartoon violence.

=== Duff ===
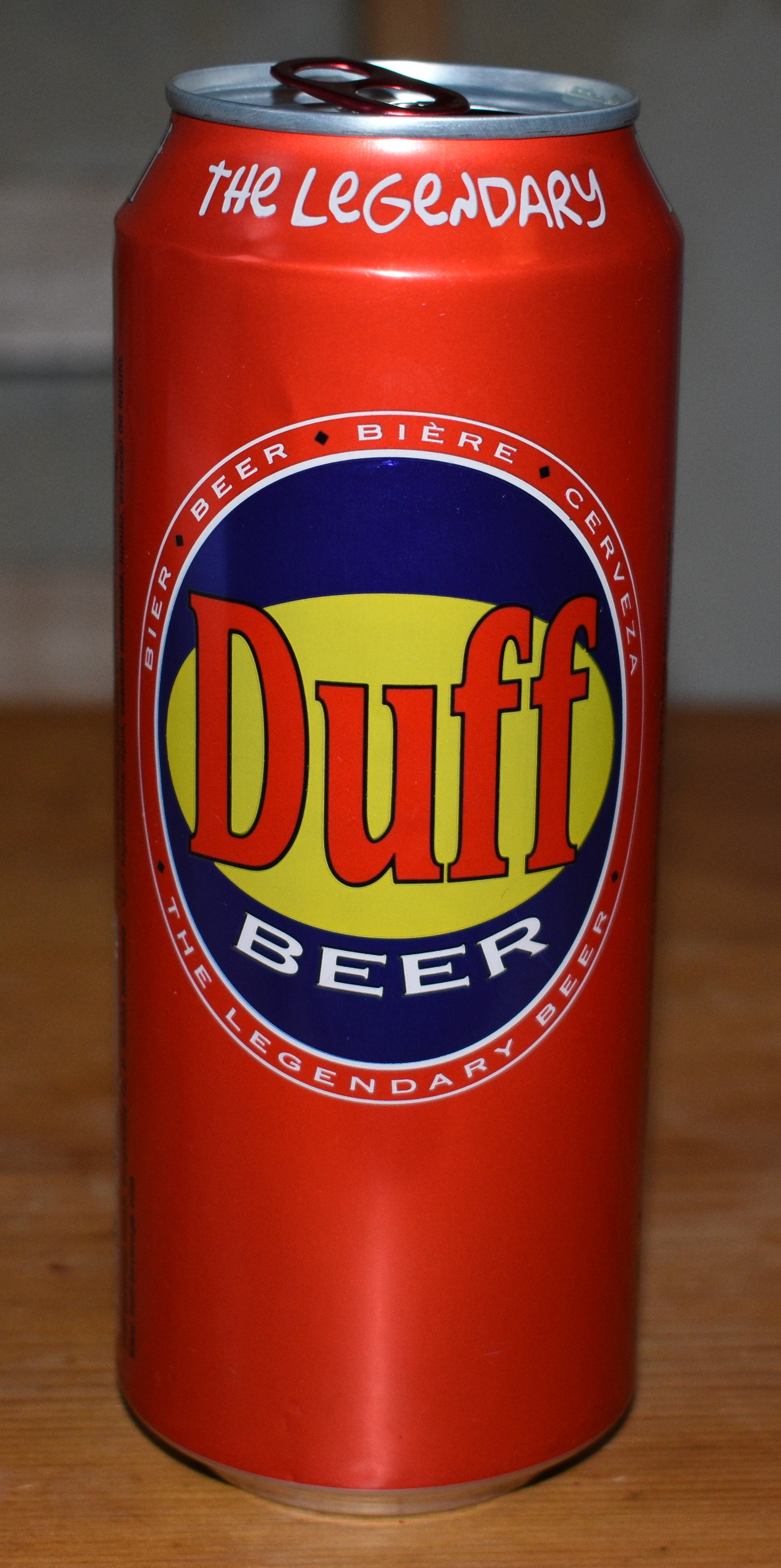
German

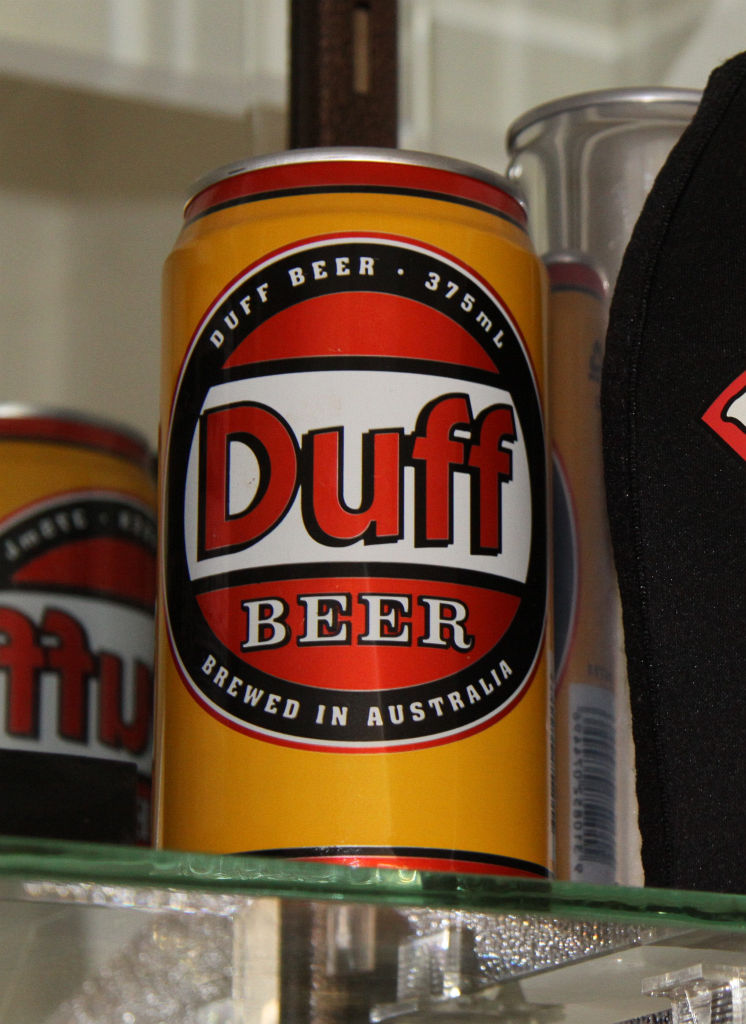
Australian

Unofficial cans of "Duff" beer

Duff Beer began as a fictional brand in The Simpsons. Beers using the Duff branding have been brewed in a number of countries, resulting in legal battles with varying results. An official version is sold in three variations near the Simpsons Ride at Universal Studios. In 2015, 20th Century Fox, the producer of The Simpsons, began selling licensed Duff beer in Chile, with a view to driving out brandjacking. In 2016, Time included Duff Beer in a list of the most influential fictional companies of all time.

=== Finder-Spyder ===
Finder-Spyder is a fictional Web search engine that appears in numerous television shows, used in the same manner as the fictitious 555 telephone number in TV and film. It has been called "an unofficial, open source stand-in for Google and its competitors" (used as a legality-free alternative to a brand-name product), and "the most popular search engine in the TV universe." Finder-Spyder appears as a top 10 pick in "best fictional brand" lists by various online media.

=== Morley ===
Morley is a fictional brand of cigarettes with packaging that resembles Marlboro cigarettes. The name "Morley" is a reference to "Marleys", a once-common nickname for Marlboro cigarettes. Television programs began using Morleys in an era where Tobacco companies were allowed to sponsor television shows and pay for product placement. If no company agreed on a deal for product placement, producers would use a non-branded product like the fictional Morleys. Morleys are produced by The Earl Hays Press, a Hollywood prop packaging service.

=== Pear ===
Kids sitcoms created by Dan Schneider on the TV channel Nickelodeon often parody the tech company Apple and its products by using fake tech products from the fictional "Pear" company, such as the PearPhone (a parody of the iPhone) and the PearPad (a parody of the iPad). These parodies would often appear in the Nickelodeon sitcoms iCarly, Victorious, Sam & Cat and Henry Danger.

=== Wonka ===
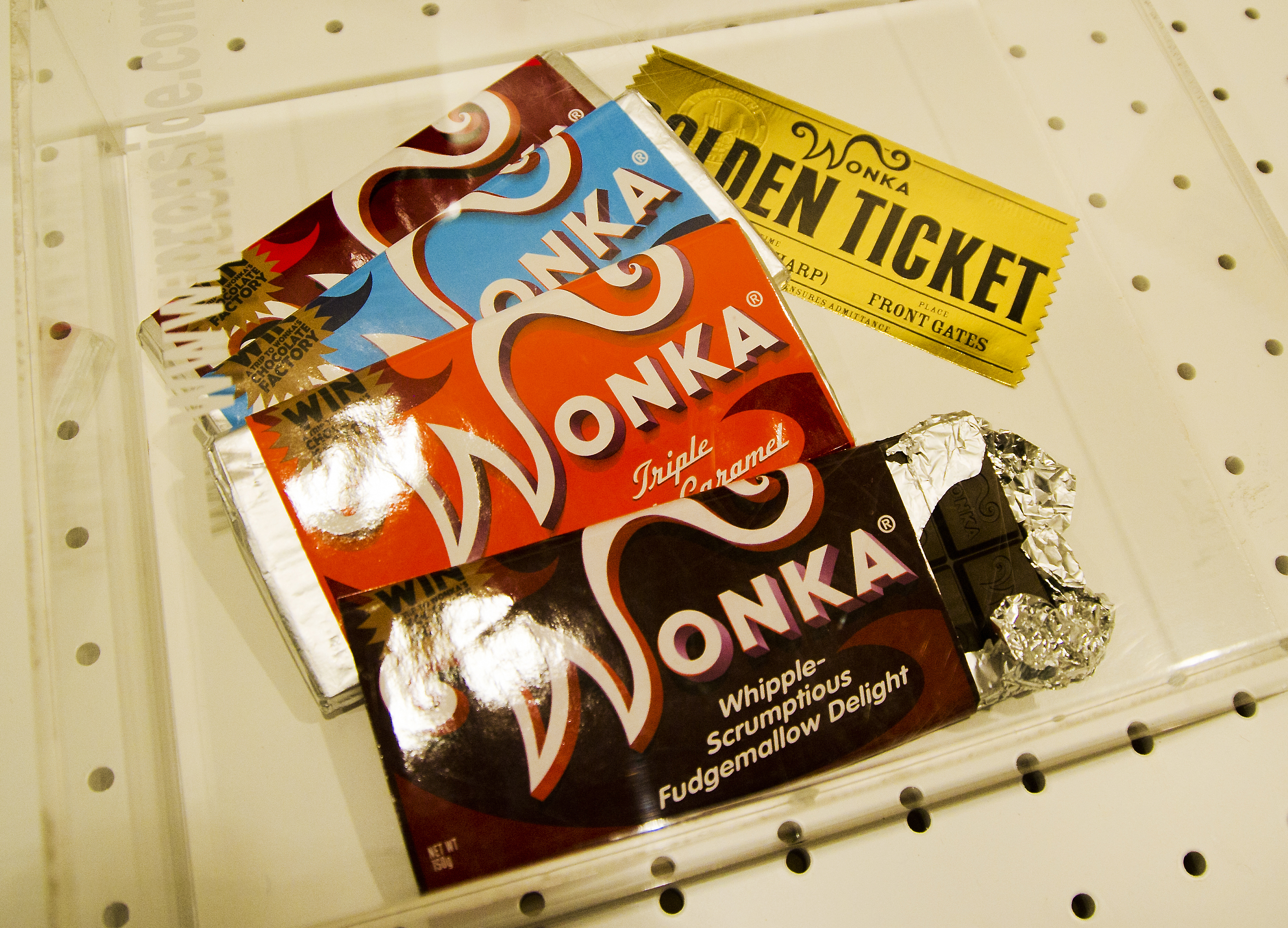
Wonka bars from Charlie and the Chocolate Factory (2005) on display

In 1964, Roald Dahl wrote Charlie and the Chocolate Factory set within the fictional Wonka Chocolate Factory. The story included several fictional candy products including the Everlasting Gobstopper and the Wonka Bar. The 1971 musical Willy Wonka & the Chocolate Factory was an adaptation of Dahl's work funded by Quaker Oats who also produced a variety of Wonka candy through their subsidiary Sunline. These candy products were largely unsuccessful and Quaker sold off Sunline by 1972. Sunline continued to make Wonka-branded candy and was later acquired by Nestlé. Although initially involved in the musical, Dahl left the project and disowned the 1971 film. After his death, Dahl's family became involved with a second film adaptation, Charlie and the Chocolate Factory (2005). This again featured Wonka branded products.

== See also ==
- List of fictional beverages
- List of fictional vehicles
- Brand
- Trademark
- Product placement
- Brand management
- Fictional company
- Saturday Night Live commercials – frequently featuring fictional brands, many listed with this entry
- Placeholder word
- Placeholder name
  - List of placeholder names
  - List of English-language placeholder names for people
  - Placeholder names in cryptography
- Metasyntactic variable
- List of terms referring to an average person
- Lorem ipsum
- Fictional company
- Evil corporation
- Independent Studio Services § Fictional brands
- Dummy pronoun
- Nonce word
- Expletive attributive
