= Placeholder word =

Word used in place of an exact word

In linguistics, a placeholder word or a placeholder is a word that is used in place of an exact word. In some cases they are used in speech to replace a forgotten word or a word about which the speaker is unsure. For example the writer may be unsure whether the technical word would be familiar to the readers or the speaker themselves is unsure which word to use. These words, such as "thingummyjig" are not part of standard written language and are not captured well by text corpora. These may replace both names of objects ("thingummabob") and the personal names (placeholder names, e.g., "Mr. Whatshisname"). Placeholder words are often used to convey vagueness. Other means to introduce vagueness are the use of taxonomic nouns with adaptors ("kind of tree"), generic words ("thing", "stuff"), etc. Some authors, e.g., Neil Grave, include generic words ("thing", "stuff") in the category of placeholder words as well. At the same time, Neil Grave notes that the generic words may perform a large number of other functions, e.g., to be a vague category marker (as in "shorts and T-shirts, and stuff").

A thorough treatment of vague language, including placeholder words was provided by Joanna Channell. In particular, she demonstrates that dictionaries often provide inadequate definitions and explanations of vague lexical items.

Some earlier studies that did not yet adopt the term "placeholder" use the terms "filler", "dummy". The terms "lexical filler", "oblitive noun/verb" are used to denote what Vera Podlesskaya calls "hesitation markers", used when a speaker is temporarily unable to recall the exact name of the object.

== Classification ==
Some functions of vague language include:

- Filling lexical (unknown words or terminology missing in the language of the speaker) gaps
- Filling knowledge (forgotten words) gaps, often forgotten temporarily, at the moment of speech
- Conveying tentativeness
- Maintaining informal style of conversation
- Replacing social taboo words ("Ken, your you-know-what [ fly ] is open.")

J. Channell grouped placeholder nouns into three categories: those which replace names, these which replace object names, those which can replace both.

Another grouping is usage motivated by speaker's abilities and usage motivated by speaker's intentions.

Some researchers distinguish "placeholder use" and "avoidance use", e.g., for demonstrative words (such as "this"), i.e., use a narrower definition of the concept of placeholder.

While in most cases the placeholders are nominal elements, verbal, adjectival, or adverbial placeholders exist, e.g., in Mandarin.

Vera Podlesskaya states that across many languages the placeholder words may be placed into the following lexical categories:

- Demonstrative, indefinite, or interrogative pronouns
- Nouns stripped of their actual semantics
- In some languages the above two may be blended
- ad-hoc constructions usually starting with an interrogative word, e.g., whatsitsname

In some languages a separate type of lexical items have been developed to serve as placeholders, variously called as "noun substitutes" or "indefinite substitution words".

== Use cases ==
In Evenki language a placeholder word may replace both nouns and verbs and may be modified (e.g., with suffixes to match its function in the structure of a sentence to some degree (although the researcher suggests that missing functionality may simply be due to the limited speech corpus).

Spanish language placeholders: cosa, cacharro, chintófono, chisme, menda, mengano.

Galician language: chintófano (unspecified object), chilindrada (small thing), chisma (unspecified or unknown object), chisme, conto (replacina an unknown or forgotten name), traste (useless thing), trasto.

In Russian linguistics the concept of "deconcretization pronouns" or "representatives" is considered. Usually they are formed from demonstratives with the addition of postfix "-to": такой-то, так-то, столько-то (takoy-to, tak-to, stolko-to) Most often these are used to simplify quotations of someone's direct speech: "Сказал, что поступит так-то и так-то" ("He said that he will do it in this and that way"), but also may be used to represent indefinite or unimportant things or numbers: "Потратил столько-то денег" ("<Someone> spent that much [irrelevant how much] money")

== See also ==
- Metasyntactic variable
- Dummy pronoun
- Nonce word
- Expletive attributive
- Placeholder name
- List of placeholder names
- List of English-language placeholder names for people
- Placeholder names in cryptography
- List of terms referring to an average person
- Lorem ipsum
- Fictional company
- Fictional brand
- Evil corporation
- Independent Studio Services § Fictional brands
