= Marlboro =

Cigarette brand

- Product type: Cigarette
- Current owner: Altria; Philip Morris International (outside the US, except Canada); Imperial Tobacco Canada (Canada)
- Produced by: Philip Morris USA (US); Philip Morris International (outside the US except Canada and India); Imperial Tobacco Canada (Canada); Godfrey Phillips India (India)
- Country: United States
- Introduced: 1924; 102 years ago
- Tagline: "Mild as May", "Come to where the flavor is. Come to Marlboro country" (1966), "You get a lot to like with a Marlboro", "You Decide", "Pursue Flavor"
- Website: marlboro.com

Marlboro (US: /ˈmɑːlˌbʌroʊ/, UK: /ˈmɑːrlbərə, ˈmɔːl-/) is an American brand of cigarettes owned and manufactured by Philip Morris USA (a branch of Altria) within the United States and by Philip Morris International (PMI, now separate from Altria) in most global territories outside the US. The brand was introduced in 1924, initially marketed towards women before it evolved towards men during the 1950s. Marlboro would eventually become one of the world's most valuable brands and best-selling products, and it was widely known for its advertising featuring the Marlboro Man, a fictional cowboy.

Today, Marlboro continues to be one of the largest brands of cigarettes in the entire world. It has a strong presence in Canada, United States of America, Indonesia, Turkey, Saudi Arabia, Philippines and India. Marlboro's largest cigarette manufacturing plant is located in Richmond, Virginia. In Canada, a separate product using the Marlboro brand is owned and manufactured by Imperial Tobacco Canada, while the international product is distributed in Canada by a unit of PMI under the name "Rooftop". Also in India, a separate Marlboro product is made and marketed by Godfrey Phillips India.

== History ==
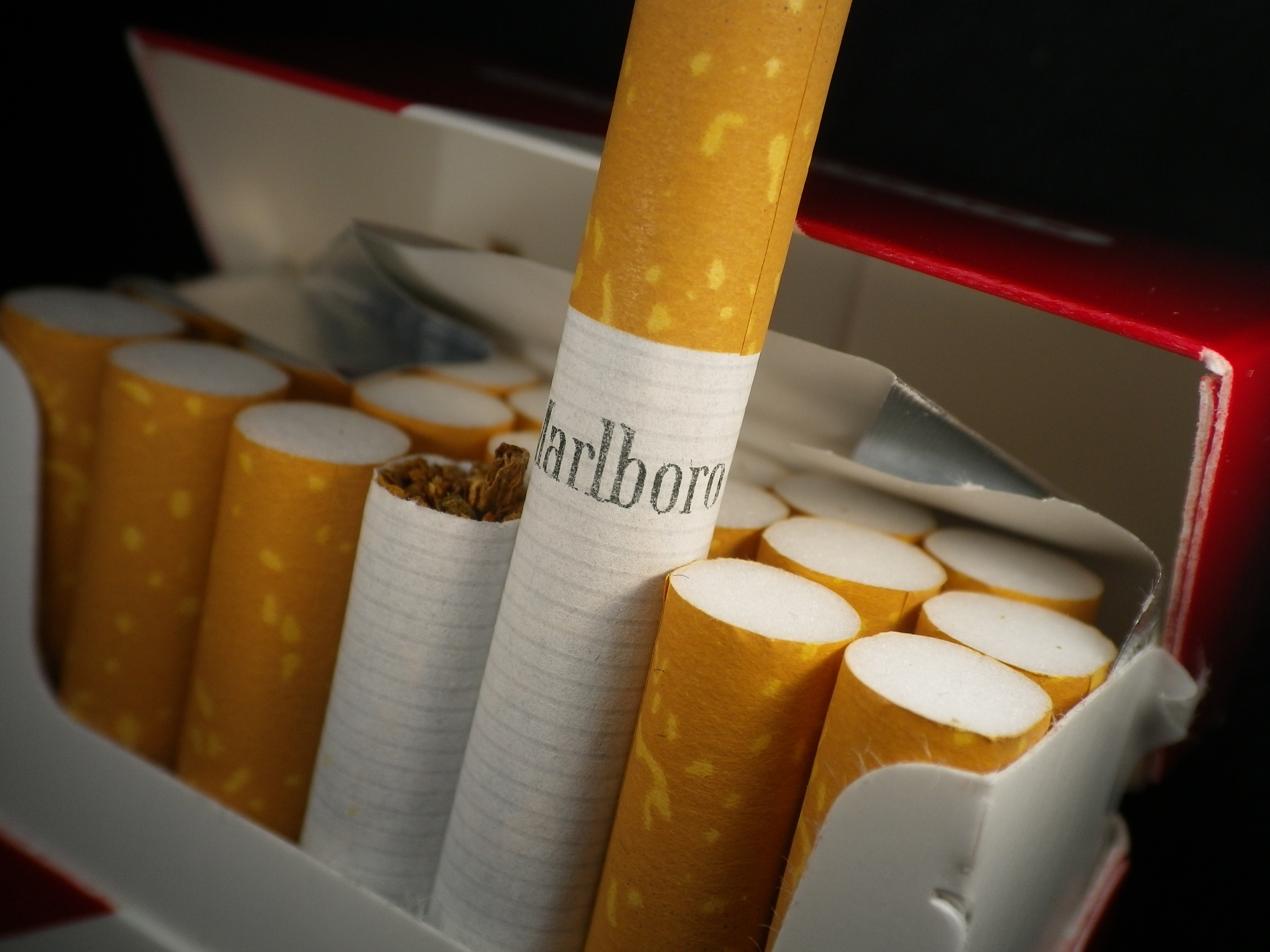
Marlboro cigarettes in a pack

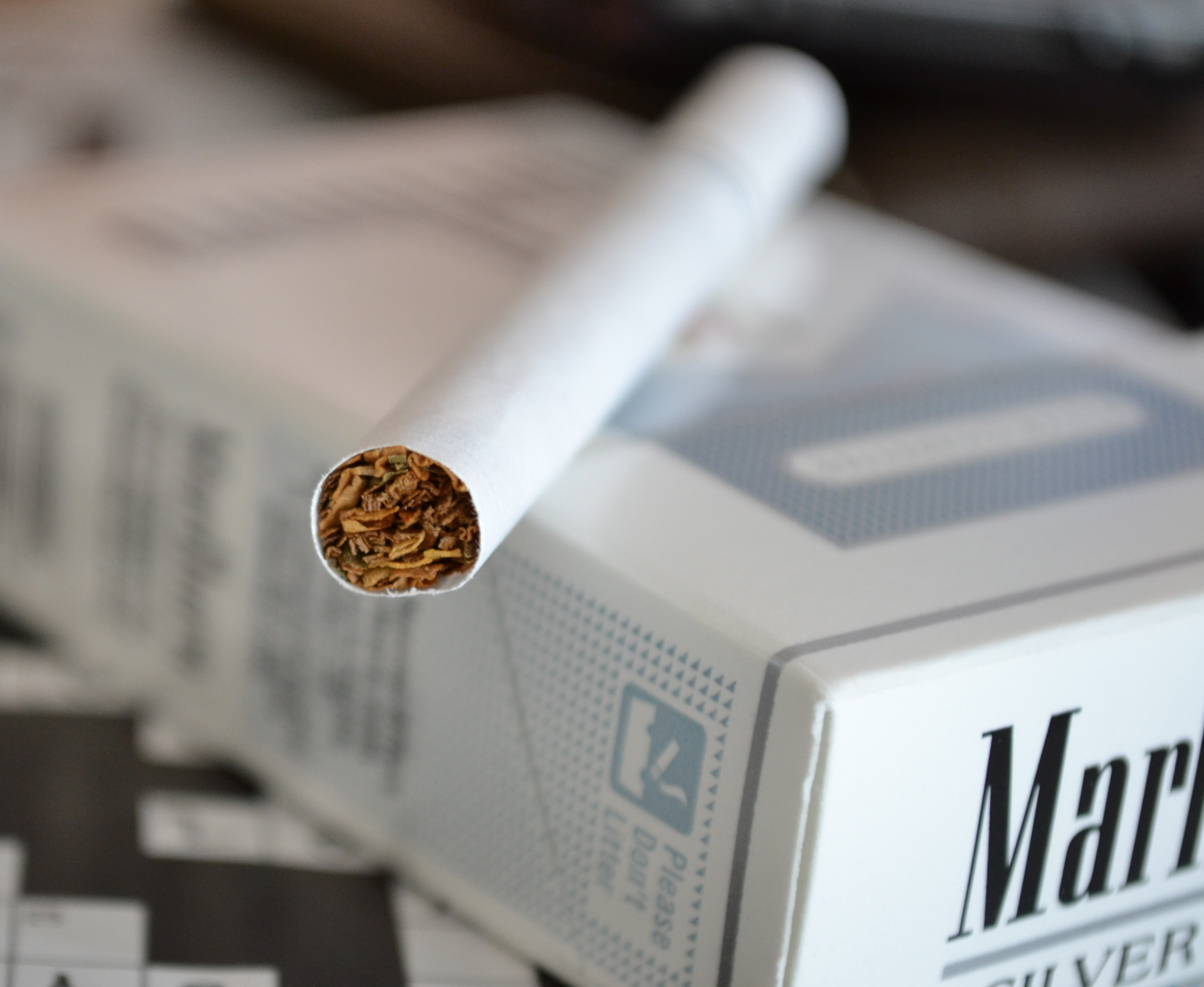
A cigarette and a pack of Marlboro Silver Pack (previously called Ultra Lights until the "light" name was banned as deceitful)

In 1847, the family of British tobacconist Philip Morris opened a shop on Bond Street, London, selling tobacco and rolled cigarettes. After Philip's death in 1873, his brother Leopold and widow Margaret continued the business, growing it and opening a factory on Great Marlborough Street, London, from which the name was taken.

A New York subsidiary was opened in 1902 to sell many of its cigarette brands. The name '"Marlboro"' was registered in the US in 1908 although no cigarette was marketed under this name until 1923. In 1924, the brand was launched. They were first marketed as "America's luxury cigarette" and were mainly sold in hotels and resorts.

Around the 1930s, it was starting to be advertised as a women's cigarette, based on the slogan "Mild As May". However, as early as 1885, a brand called "Marlborough" was already being marketed as a "ladies' favorite" by Philip Morris & Co.

Shortly before World War II, the brand's sales stagnated at less than 1% of tobacco sales in the US and was briefly withdrawn from the market. After the war, Camel, Lucky Strike and Chesterfield were the only common cigarettes.

After scientists published a major study linking smoking to lung cancer in the 1950s, Philip Morris repositioned Marlboro as a men's cigarette in order to fit a market niche of men who were concerned about lung cancer while also concerned with masculinity if they smoked a filtered cigarette usually marketed to women. The Leo Burnett advertising agency solved the problem by a new style of advertising that dispensed with copy and created a visual personality for the brand. Marlboro ads now featured masculinity. The Marlboro Man was a sea captain, gunsmith, athlete and cowboy.

Part of Marlboro's rise in market share was its ability to produce "milder, more aromatic, sweeter, and less harsh" cigarettes by adding ammonia to the tobacco. Further usage of diammonium phosphate allowed Marlboro to free base the nicotine in tobacco, allowing for more efficient delivery. Marlboro kept this process secret for many years, as freebasing is the same process used to produce crack cocaine from normal cocaine. Some experts have called the product that Marlboro sold "crack tobacco."

The first Marlboro cigarettes manufactured outside of the United States were produced in Switzerland in 1957 when Philip Morris International signed an agreement with Neuchâtel-based Fabriques de Tabac Réunies, before acquiring them 6 years later.

In the late 1960s, Marlboro "Longhorn 100's" were introduced. Although color-coded with gold, they were full flavor cigarettes, not lights. In 1972, Marlboro became the best-selling brand of tobacco in the world.

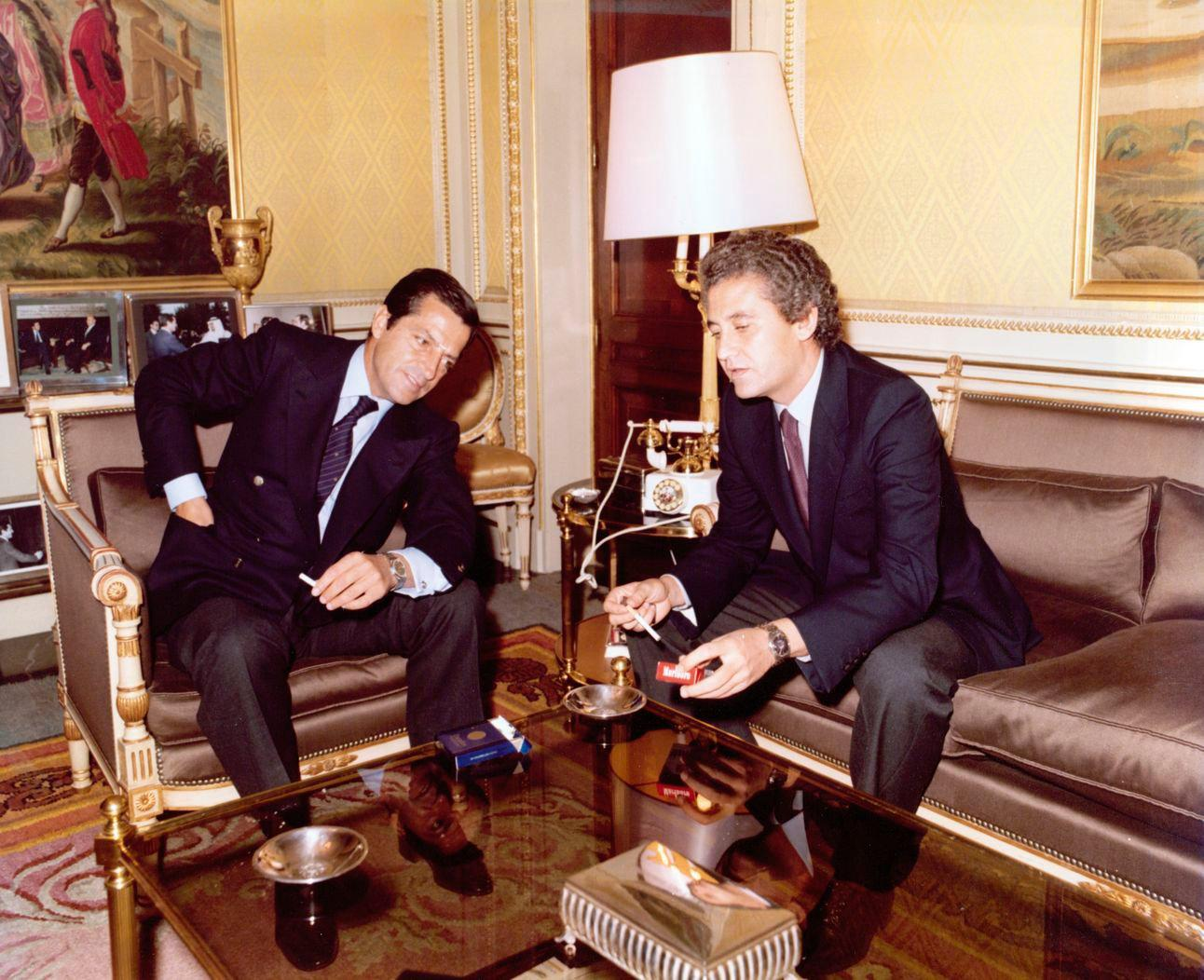
Adolfo Suárez and Rafael Escuredo smoking Marlboro cigarettes in La Moncloa, 1980

In order to comply with a 2006 court ruling in United States v. Philip Morris USA, Inc., et al., Philip Morris (and all other cigarette companies) are now prevented from using words such as "Lights", "Ultra-Lights", "Medium", "Mild", or any similar designation that may yield an impression of being safer than regular full flavored cigarettes. Thus Marlboro and other cigarette companies use only color-coding instead; for example, Marlboro Lights are now called Marlboro Gold Pack.

Philip Morris responded to the popularity of Pall Mall, the number three brand, by pushing Marlboro Special Blends, a lower-priced cigarette.

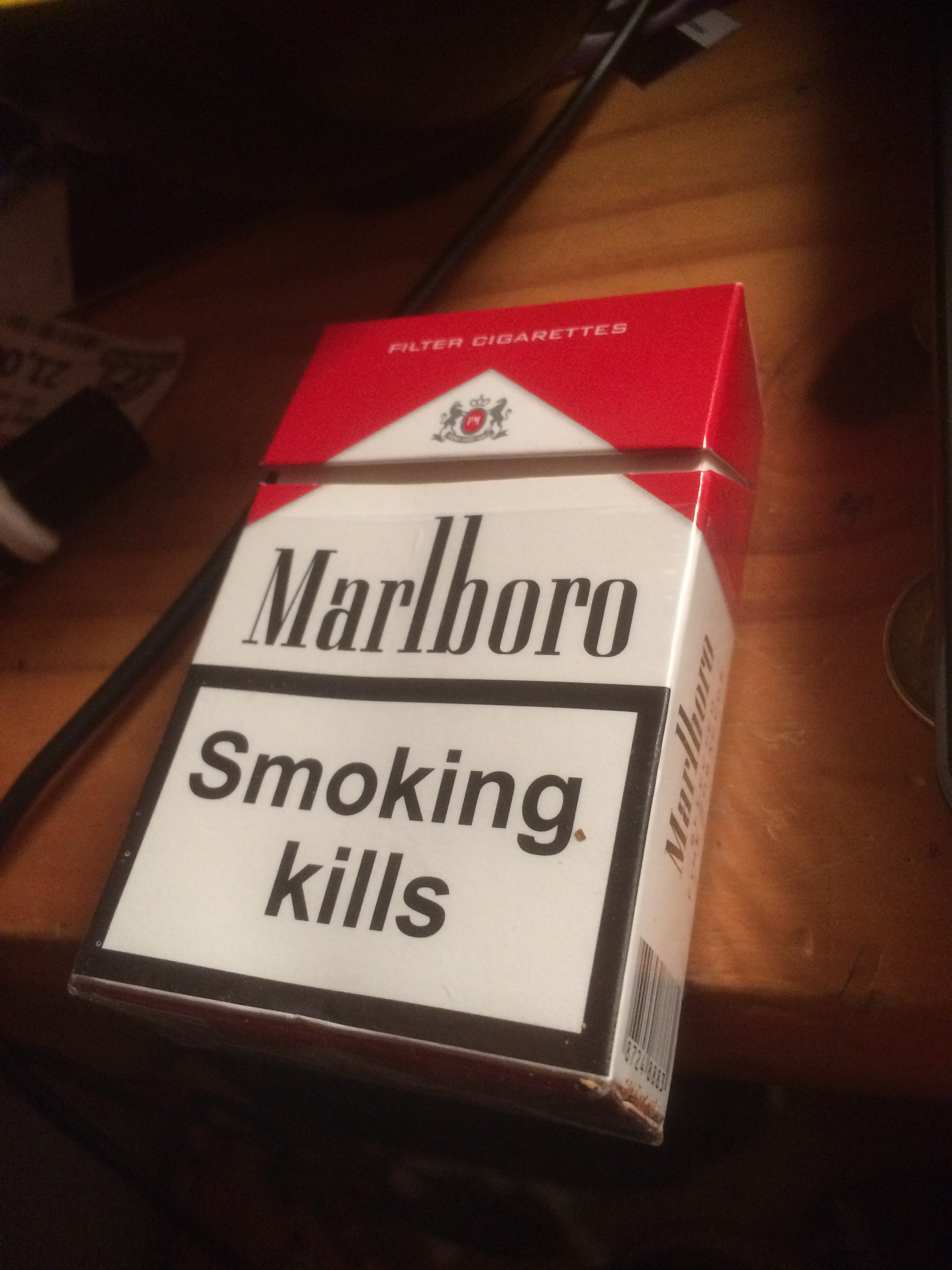
British Marlboro cigarette pack with a government health warning prior to the introduction of plain packaging.

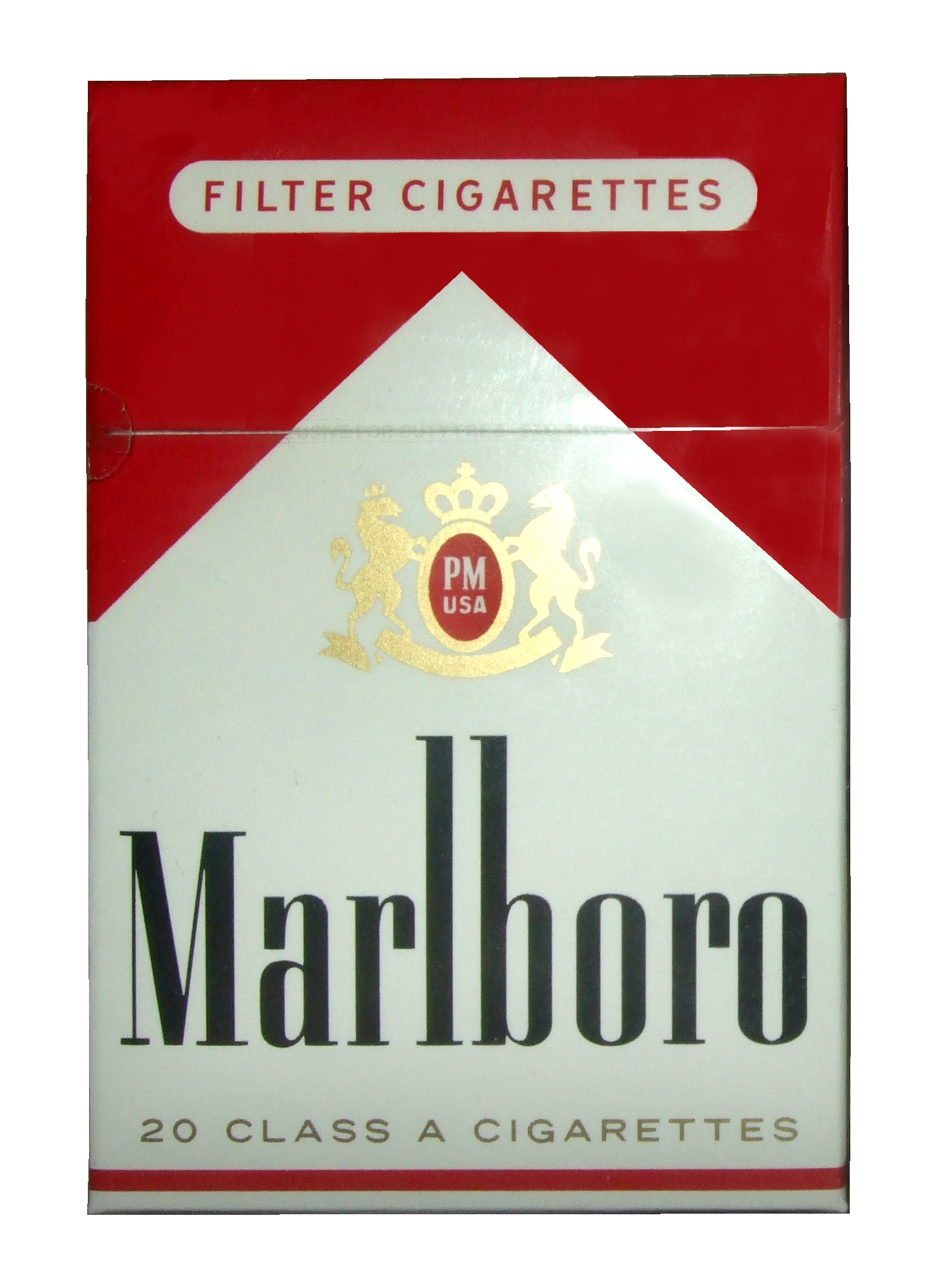
Marlboro cigarette pack from a duty-free shop in the United States (2010), in the design which was used—with only minor changes—for most of the product's lifetime. In the 2020s, this has become very rare due to the international use of health warning signs.

In 2013, Philip Morris International introduced "Marlboro 2.0". The pack design was changed; the dark red was replaced with a lighter red, the "Marlboro" and Philip Morris logo became ribbed and transparent, and around 2017 a special "Smart SEAL" was introduced to keep the stored cigarettes fresh for a longer period of time. The Marlboro 2.0 packs are mainly available in Europe and some parts of Africa, Asia and Latin America, but not in the US or in countries with plain packaging laws.

In 2015, Philip Morris announced they would introduce a "Firm Filter" to their Marlboro Red, Gold, Silver Blue, Ice Blast and White Menthol variants. Philip Morris managing director for the UK and Ireland, Martin Inkster, said that the Firm Filter technique was added to "offer quality you can feel and it is a cleaner way to stub out your cigarette".

In January 2023 the US Food Drug Administration approved of marketing around the U.S. for multiple Marlboro Vape Heatsticks, Sienna Heatstick, Amber Heatstick & Bronze Heatstick.

== Advertising ==
In the 1920s, advertising for the cigarette was primarily based on how ladylike the filter cigarette was, in an attempt to appeal to the mass market. To this end, the filter had a printed red band around it to hide lipstick stains, calling it "Beauty Tips to Keep the Paper from Your Lips".

The red and white package was designed by designer Frank Gianninoto. The repositioning of Marlboro as a men's cigarette was handled by Chicago advertiser Leo Burnett. The proposed campaign was to present a lineup of manly figures: sea captains, weightlifters, war correspondents, construction workers, etc. The cowboy was to have been the first in this series. While Philip Morris was concerned about the campaign, they eventually gave the green light.

Marlboro's market share rose from less than one percent to the fourth best-selling brand. This convinced Philip Morris to drop the lineup of manly figures and stick with the cowboy, later known as the Marlboro Man. From 1963, the television advertisements used Elmer Bernstein's theme from The Magnificent Seven.

Over the years, Philip Morris has made many billboard, poster and magazine adverts.

Philip Morris also made various sports-related billboards, stickers and other memorabilia throughout the years, mainly promoting the Marlboro brand via its McLaren and Ferrari teams partnerships in places like Russia and Monaco.

Through licensees, Philip Morris sells various merchandising products, such as lighters, ashtrays, sunglasses and other accessories, which are sometimes given away to the target group as part of marketing promotions.

In 1983, the campaign "Marlboro Adventure Team" was launched in Germany, in which purchasers of the brand could apply to win a trip to the USA to live like the "Marlboro Man", as well as a plethora of different clothing items and accessories.

=== Post-Tobacco Master Settlement Agreement ===
In the aftermath of the 1998 Master Settlement Agreement, Marlboro, then the leading cigarette brand in the United States, was greatly restricted in its capacity to advertise its product offerings. Philip Morris thus shifted primarily to 'point of sale' and mail advertising. By 2005, Marlboro had exclusive contracts with almost half of the country's retailers to display and advertise its premium offerings in prominent locations.

By 2000, the company had adopted the Marlboro Miles rewards catalog as a means of incentivizing consumer loyalty. In 2009, the Ninth Circuit Court of Appeals overturned an earlier court judgement which had found that the proof-of-purchase system it utilized was by definition a 'gift certificate' program. This secondary judgement allowed Philip Morris to revoke the validity of 'Five Miles' products after a certain date.

=== Sport sponsorship ===
According to Ellen Merlo, vice president of marketing services at Philip Morris, quoted in a 1989 Marlboro advertisement:

We perceive Formula One and Indy car racing as adding, if you will, a modern-day dimension to the Marlboro Man. The image of Marlboro is very rugged, individualistic, heroic. And so is this style of auto racing. From an image standpoint, the fit is good.

==== Formula One ====
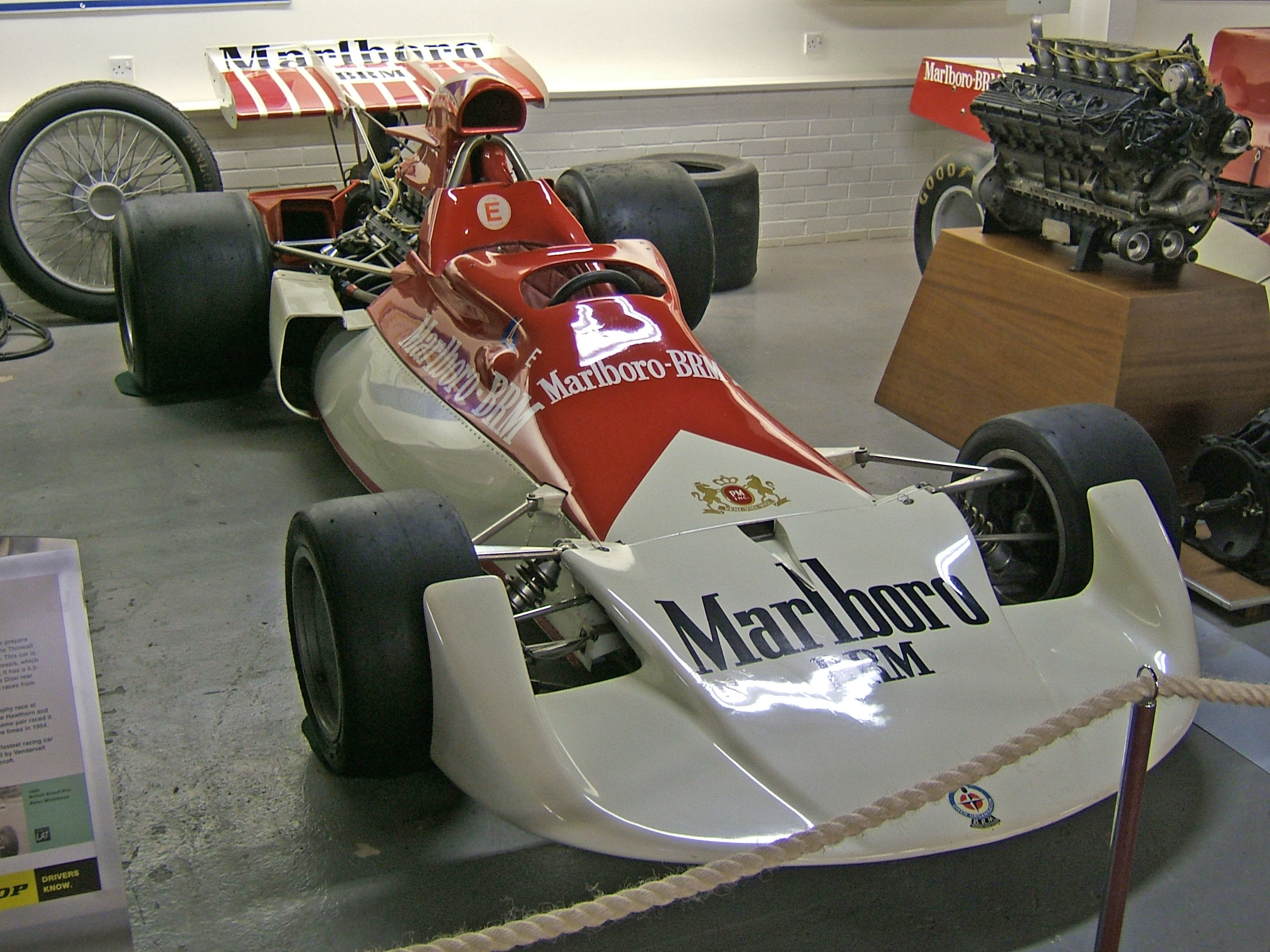
BRM P180: Marlboro's motorsport sponsorship started with the BRM Formula One team in 1972.

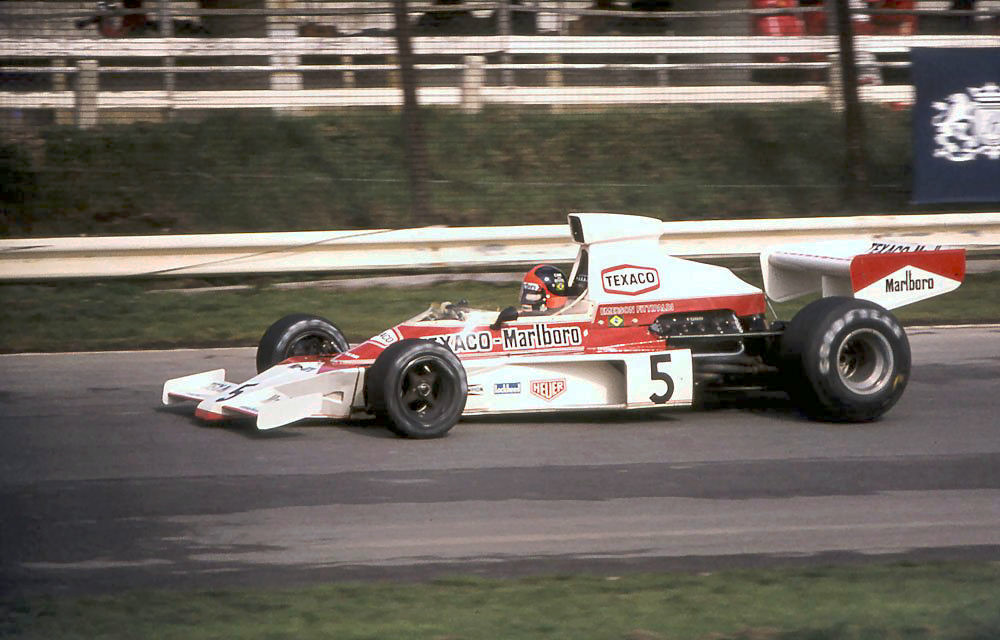
Marlboro colours first appeared on a McLaren car in the 1974 season. This is Emerson Fittipaldi driving the McLaren M23 at the 1974 British Grand Prix.

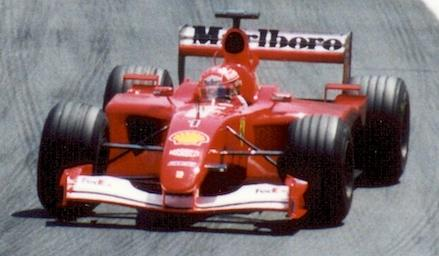
The Marlboro sponsored Ferrari of Michael Schumacher in 2001.

Marlboro is known for its association with motor racing. This started in the 1972 season with the sponsorship of the Formula One team BRM. The first win for a Marlboro-sponsored Formula One car was achieved at the 1972 Monaco Grand Prix by Jean-Pierre Beltoise driving for the BRM team. In 1973 and 1974, the cigarette giant backed the Frank Williams Racing Cars team, whose cars were registered as Iso-Marlboro.

In the 1974 season, under the leadership of advertising executive and eventual Formula One power broker John Hogan, Marlboro became associated with the McLaren team. The team won their first World Constructors' Championship as well as first World Drivers' Championship (for Emerson Fittipaldi) in the first season of the partnership between McLaren and Marlboro. The team won another drivers title in 1976 for James Hunt. Following that, the partnership went through a dry patch until Ron Dennis's Project Four Organization took over the team in 1981. Marlboro-sponsored McLaren triumphed Formula One for much of the 1980s and early 1990s, with Niki Lauda, Alain Prost and Ayrton Senna between them winning the Drivers' Championship all but one year from 1984 to 1991. After the departure of Ayrton Senna at the end of the 1993 season, Marlboro McLaren never won a race again. Marlboro ended their sponsorship of the team at the end of the 1996 season, which ended the red and white McLaren livery. McLaren was sponsored by West from the start of the 1997 season onwards. McLaren and Marlboro had the longest sponsorship deal between a team and its title sponsor in Formula One history, which lasted for 23 consecutive seasons (1974–1996).

Over the years, McLaren altered the Marlboro livery to comply with regional anti-tobacco sponsorship laws which were in place in countries like France, the UK and later Germany. The Marlboro logo was replaced by a chevron in 1974, with a barcode in 1984 and 1985 and from 1987 to 1992 or with "McLaren" in 1986 and from 1991 to 1993 and 1994 to 1996. At the 1986 Portuguese Grand Prix, Keke Rosberg's car was painted yellow and white rather than red and white, to advertise Marlboro Lights.

Marlboro also sponsored Scuderia Ferrari's drivers since the 1973 season (the brand appeared only on helmets and suits) but only in 1984 Marlboro became a minor sponsor on Ferrari's Formula One cars. Until then, Enzo Ferrari allowed only technical suppliers brands to appear on his team cars. In 1993, Marlboro became the main sponsor (surpassing Goodyear, and making that Ferrari painting the car's high air boxes were painted red and white), eventually becoming the title sponsor in 1997 when the team was officially renamed Scuderia Ferrari Marlboro. Marlboro remained Ferrari's title sponsor until the 2011 European Grand Prix and the main sponsor until the end of the 2017 season.

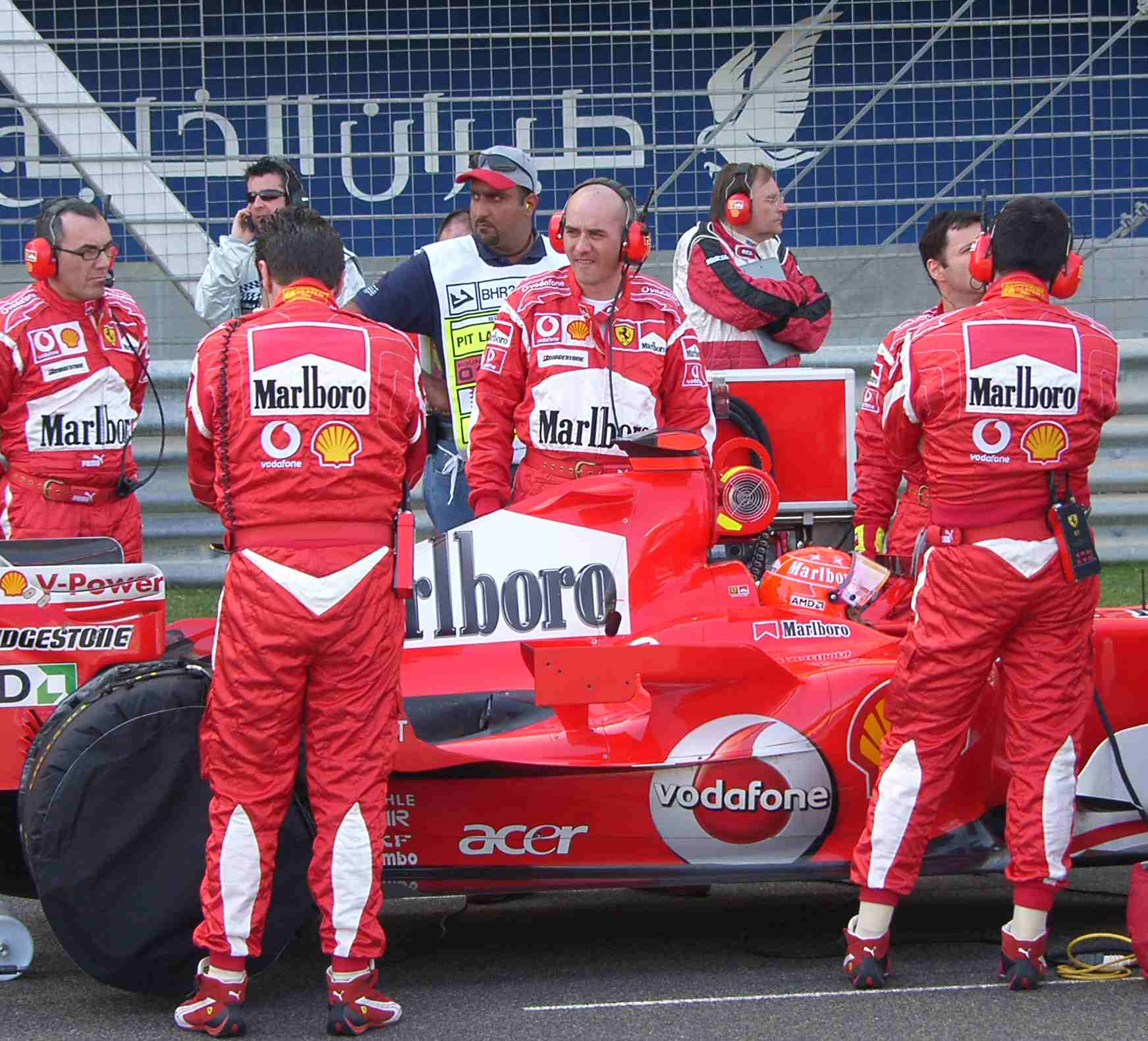
Prominent Marlboro branding on Ferrari Formula One car and team at the 2006 Bahrain Grand Prix

Over the years, Ferrari, just like McLaren, had to alter the Marlboro livery in various ways to comply with regional anti-tobacco sponsoring laws which were in place in countries like France, the UK and later Germany. The Marlboro logo was removed completely or replaced with a white space from 2000 to 2004 (The Ferrari cars had white spaces over Marlboro occasionally in 1998 and 1999), changed to a "bar code" from 1994 to 1999 and in 2005 and 2006, or the text was removed while keeping the chevron with the driver's name (1993) and in the team member clothing, the Marlboro logo became a white square with a red stripe above with the driver's written name from the 1980s until 1996. The team used a special livery for the 2001 Italian Grand Prix in remembrance of the September 11 attacks in the US; both cars ran without any sponsorship livery and sported matte black nosecones. In the 2005 Bahrain Grand Prix the cars sported black nosecones as a sign of mourning for Pope John Paul II.

In September 2005, Ferrari signed an extension of their sponsorship arrangement with Marlboro until 2011. This agreement came at a time when tobacco sponsorship had become wholly banned in the European Union and other F1 teams ended their relationships with tobacco companies. In reporting the deal, F1 Racing magazine judged it to be a "black day" for the sport, putting non-tobacco funded teams at a disadvantage and discouraging other brands from entering a sport still associated with tobacco. The magazine estimated that in the period between 2005 and 2011, Ferrari received $1 billion from the agreement. Depending on the venue of races and the particular national laws, the Marlboro branding became largely subliminal in most countries.

In mid-2006, special "racing editions" of Marlboro Red were sold in the UK, with a Ferrari-inspired design, although the Ferrari name and badge were not used. In April 2008, Marlboro displayed explicit on-car branding on Ferrari for the last time, then permanently replaced with a variety of barcodes in place of it. Since then, there were calls from leading health officials, the European Commissioner for Health and influential doctors for a review of the subliminal advertising contract Marlboro has with Advertising Guerrilla and Ferrari, due to the implications of influencing the purchase of cigarettes with possible subliminal advertising, as no tobacco products can be promoted in sporting events in Europe. The Ferrari team claimed the barcode was part of the car design, not an advertising message.

An article published in the academic journal Tobacco Control which reported research into the history of tobacco sponsorship in motorsport stated that Marlboro had used vertical stripes in its sponsorship of F1 cars as early as 1972 with BRM, as well as with McLaren in 1988 and Ferrari in 1993, that these had been used in the same locations on cars and driver clothing as conventional Marlboro logos, that when the barcode logo was finally removed by Ferrari they announced that they had made the decision with Philip Morris, and that then Philip Morris head of sponsorship Maurizio Arrivabene had referred to the barcode design as "our logo" in an online article, concluding that the barcode was a form of "alibi marketing" which used the fundamentals of the Marlboro brand identity to advertise it whilst avoiding conventional logos.

The controversial barcode design was removed by Ferrari for the start of the Spanish Grand Prix in the 2010 season, but the barcode remained on drivers' team gear. In January 2011, the Scuderia Ferrari presented a new logo for its racing team. This logo is considered by an F1 website as an advertisement for Marlboro, evoking the top-left corner design of a Marlboro cigarettes pack.

In June 2011, Ferrari extended its partnership with Marlboro through to the end of 2015, despite cigarette advertising being banned in the sport. The deal has been subsequently renewed for three more years, through 2018. In February 2018, Philip Morris renewed their partnership deal with Ferrari until the end of 2021. While the logo, which has been in place since 2011, has been removed on this year's car. Before 2018 Japanese Grand Prix, Ferrari launches their revised SF71H livery featuring PMI's Mission Winnow brand.

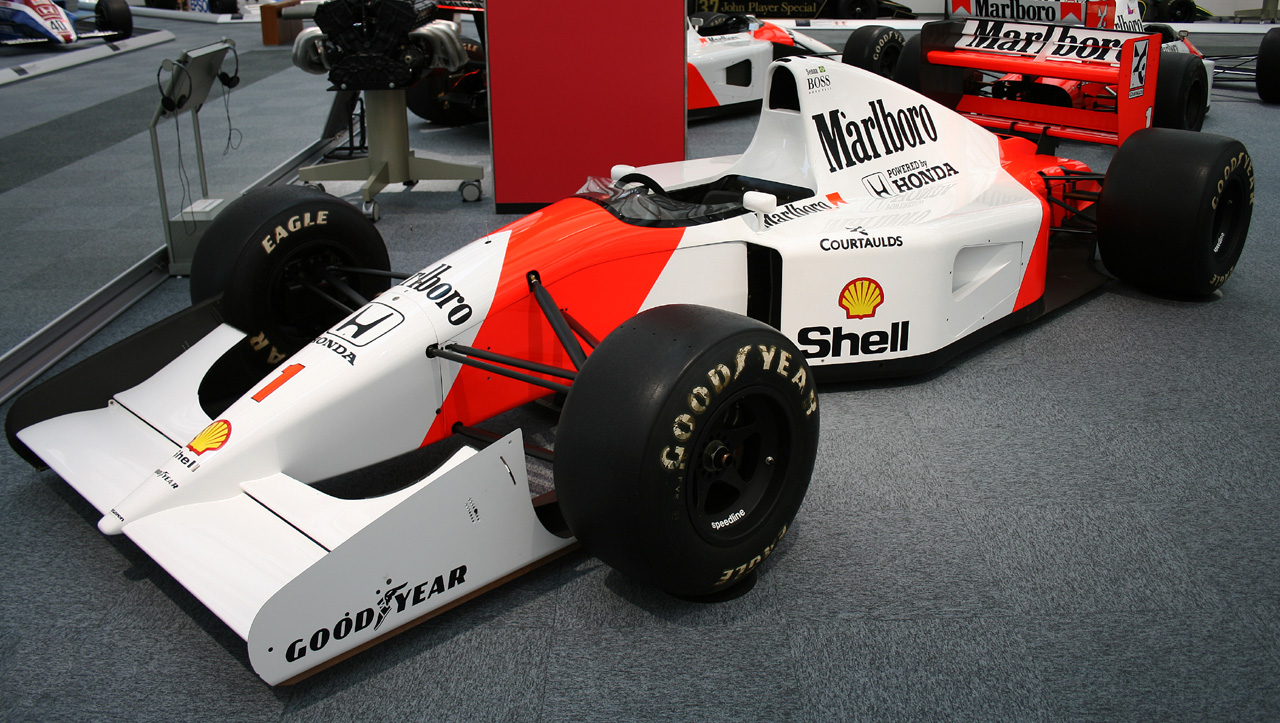
A Marlboro-sponsored McLaren MP4/7 at the Honda Collection Hall

Marlboro had provided financial support to many racing drivers, the most illustrious of whom are Alain Prost, Ayrton Senna and Mika Häkkinen. From 1970 until the mid-1990s, the logos of the cigarettes could be present on the combinations of the drivers if they were not present on the cars. Marlboro has also sponsored many grand prix races up until 2005.

Marlboro also sponsored a multitude of other, smaller teams in Formula One. It was the main sponsor of Alfa Romeo F1 Team between 1980 and 1983, although unable to match up to its pre-war and 1950s heyday, the team only achieving one pole position, one fastest lap and four podium finishes. In 1984 the Italian clothing brand Benetton took over Alfa Romeo's livery sponsorship, which they held until the withdrawal of Alfa Romeo from Formula One at the end of 1985. The Marlboro logo was replaced with a barcode at certain races, due to tobacco or alcohol sponsorship bans in place.

Marlboro sponsored the BMS Scuderia Italia team from 1988 until 1992, when Chesterfield became their main sponsor. The livery was similar to the Ferrari and Alfa Romeo ones. The Marlboro logo was displayed on the front and side of the cars and on the drivers' helmets. In some races where explicit tobacco sponsoring was forbidden, the Marlboro logo was removed.

Marlboro sponsored the Arrows F1 (by the time known as "Footwork") team in 1994. While Ruffles, a potato chip brand, sponsored the car, Marlboro sponsored the drivers' helmets.

Marlboro sponsored the EuroBrun team in 1988. The ER188, driven by Oscar Larrauri, Stefano Modena and Gregor Foitek, featured the Marlboro logo on the helmets of the drivers, as well as the Marlboro logo and name on the side of the cars.

Marlboro sponsored the Fittipaldi Automotive team in 1981. The Marlboro logo was displayed on the helmets of the drivers.

Marlboro sponsored the Forti F1 team in 1995 and 1996. The logo was displayed on the top side of the car, as well as on the helmets of the drivers. Marlboro sponsored the Merzario team from 1977 until the team's collapse in 1979. The Marlboro logo was displayed on the front, side and on the drivers' helmets. Marlboro sponsored the Minardi team in 1995. The Marlboro logo was displayed on the front and side of the cars and on the drivers' helmets. In some races where explicit tobacco sponsoring was forbidden, the Marlboro logo was replaced with a barcode. Marlboro sponsored the Onyx Grand Prix team in 1989 and 1990. The Marlboro logo was displayed on the front and side of the cars and on the drivers' helmets. In some races where explicit tobacco sponsoring was forbidden, the Marlboro logo was replaced with a barcode, but the Chevron logo was retained. Marlboro sponsored Team Rebaque in 1979. The Marlboro logo was displayed on the front and side of the cars and on the drivers' helmets. In some races where explicit tobacco sponsoring was forbidden, the Marlboro logo was removed. Marlboro sponsored the Rial Racing team in 1988 and 1989. The Marlboro logo was displayed on the front and side of the cars and on the drivers' helmets. In some races where explicit tobacco sponsoring was forbidden, the Marlboro logo was replaced with a barcode. Marlboro sponsored the Spirit Racing team in 1983 and 1984. The Marlboro logo was displayed on the front and side of the cars and on the drivers' helmets.

==== GP2 ====
From 2005 to 2007, GP2 Series team ART Grand Prix was sponsored by Marlboro. The Marlboro logos were prominently shown on the car in the 2005 and 2006 seasons, but in 2007 the team only sponsored the brand on the rear wing. In countries where the sponsoring of tobacco was forbidden, the Marlboro logos were replaced with a barcode.

==== Grand Prix motorcycle racing ====
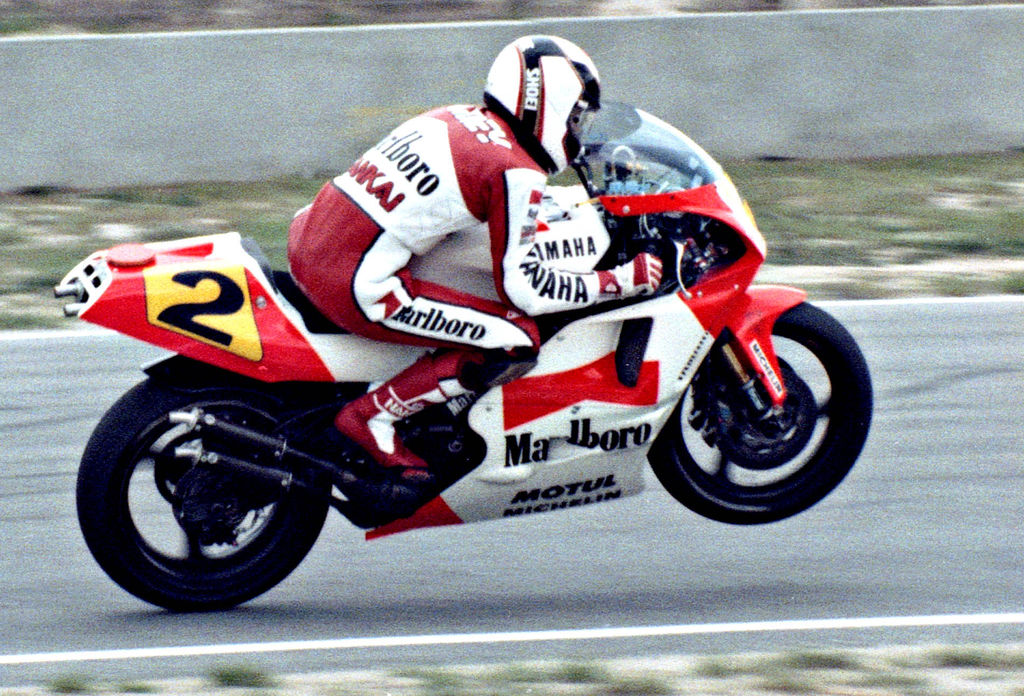
Wayne Rainey on a Yamaha YZR500 in 1990

Marlboro entered the Grand Prix motorcycle racing in the seventies as personal sponsor of riders like Giacomo Agostini, Angel Nieto and Jarno Saarinen. In 1976, Marlboro backed Agostini's team, who raced MV Agusta bikes with little factory support.

Since 1983, the cigarette brand sponsored the Yamaha 500 cc works team, which was managed by Agostini until 1989 and then by Kenny Roberts until 1996. During that period, the Japanese bikes won six World Championships and, as a result of their sponsorship, Marlboro decals on race replica bikes became one of the most popular decal kits that were available.

In the 1990s, Marlboro's livery also appeared on other bikes, especially the Hondas entered by Team Pileri (from 1992 to 1995), Pons Racing (in 1993) and Erv Kanemoto's team (in 1997 and 1998) who achieved the 1997 250 cc World Championship with Max Biaggi.

The Yamaha works team was again associated with Marlboro between 1999 and 2002.

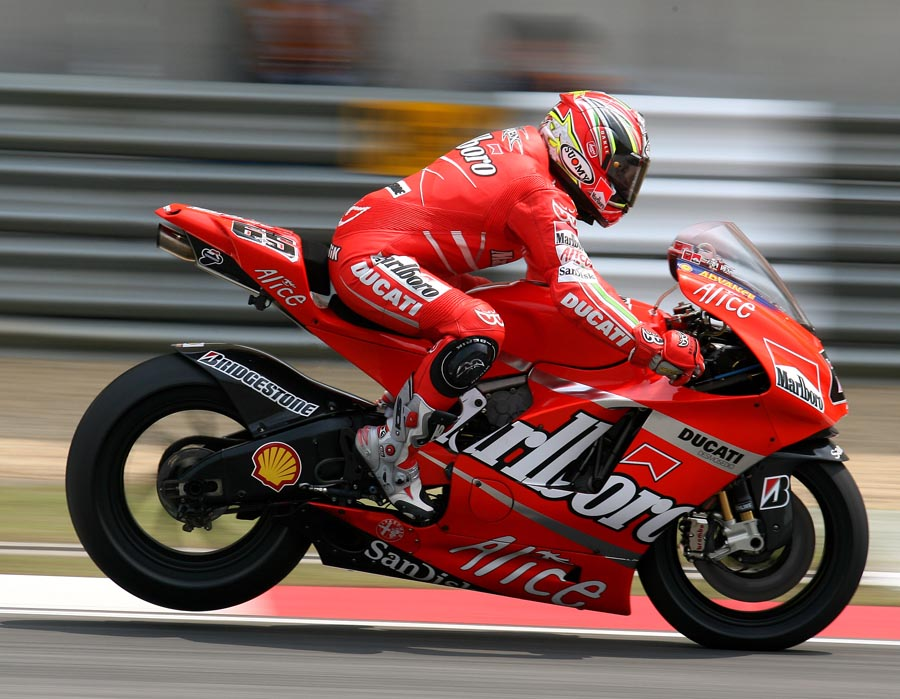
Loris Capirossi riding a Desmosedici GP7 at 2007 Chinese Grand Prix

Marlboro sponsored the Ducati Corse MotoGP team from 2003. Casey Stoner took his first MotoGP title in 2007. As of the 2009 Grand Prix motorcycle racing season they were only allowed to brand the bikes at one round, in Qatar at the Losail International Circuit, using the barcode in other races. The controversial barcode design was then removed by Ducati for the start of the French motorcycle Grand Prix in the 2010 season. In January 2011 the Ducati Team presented a new logo which was regarded as a subliminal advertisement for Marlboro, evoking the top-left corner design of a Marlboro cigarette pack, similar to the one used by Ferrari.

In January 2018, it was speculated that Ducati would carry sponsorship by Philip Morris' heat-not-burn brand iQOS instead, bypassing currently in-place laws that prohibit specific advertising of tobacco products.

==== Superbike World Championship ====
Marlboro sponsored the Yamaha Dealer Team from its inaugural season in 1988 to 1990.

==== CART/IndyCar ====
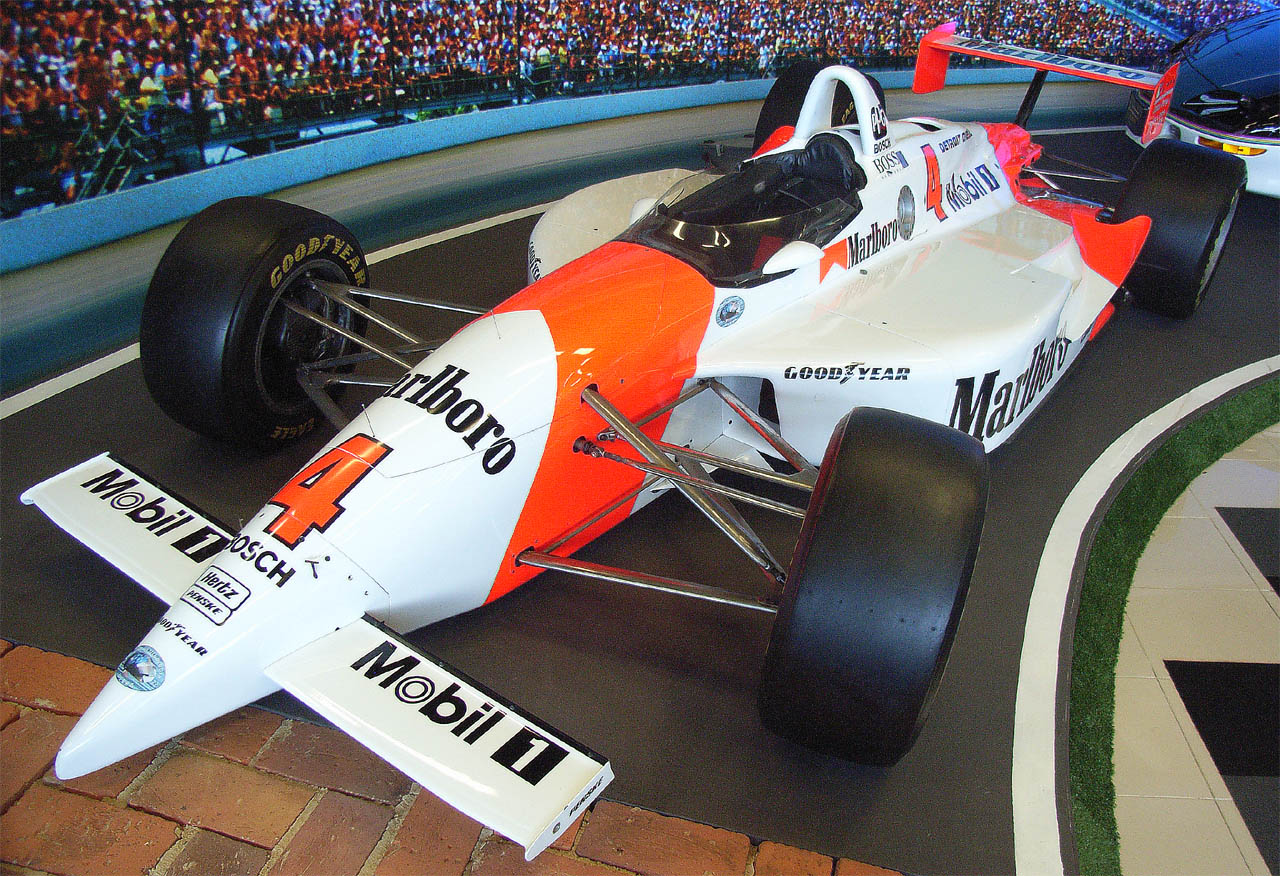
Penske PC-22 driven by Emerson Fittipaldi in 1993

Marlboro sponsorship in IndyCar dates back to 1986 when the livery appeared on the Emerson Fittipaldi's car entered by Patrick Racing. In 1990 Penske Racing hired Fittipaldi and started a 20 years-long association with Marlboro and its distinctive red and white livery. However, in the 2007 season Marlboro logos were hidden and subsequently replaced with Team Penske branding but the team retained the color scheme as Philip Morris USA was still Penske's main sponsor (similar case to Scuderia Ferrari and Ducati MotoGP Team that had Marlboro sponsorship but both Ferrari and Ducati teams forced to hide the Marlboro logos due to anti-tobacco advertising law).

2009 was the final year of the Penske-Marlboro association.

==== 24 Hours of Le Mans ====
Since their start in Formula One, Marlboro has also sponsored numerous teams and races, from Joest Racing in Group C in 1983 to Toyota at the 24 Hours of Le Mans in 1999 (despite a tobacco advertisement ban in France).

==== Masters of Formula 3 ====
Marlboro sponsored the Marlboro Masters Formula Three race in Zandvoort.

==== World Rally Championship ====
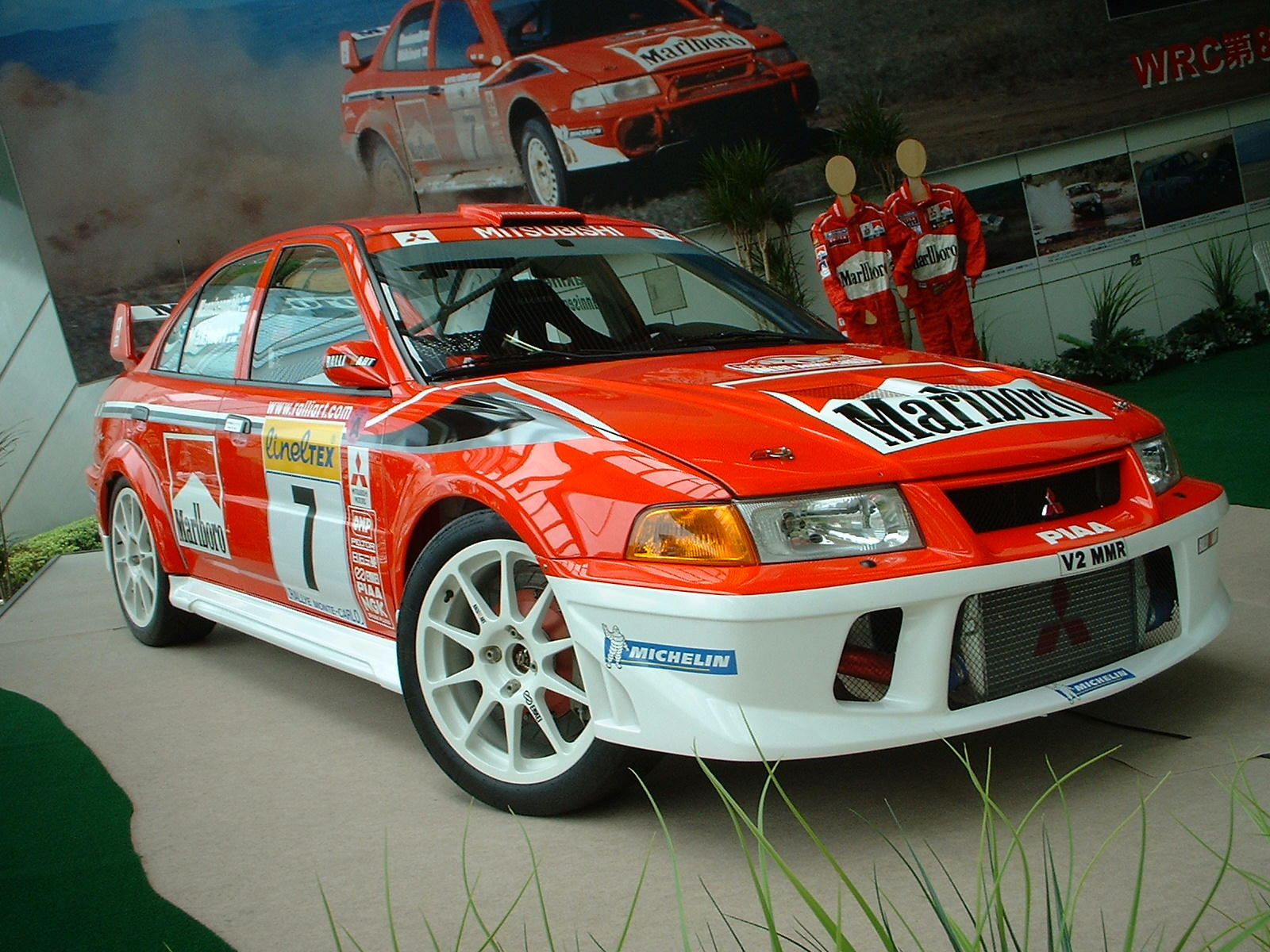
The Marlboro Mitsubishi Ralliart Lancer Evolution VI Group A rally car

Marlboro has a long history in rallying sponsorship, including the factory World Rally Championship teams of Lancia (between 1972 and 1974), Mitsubishi (from 1999 to 2002) and Peugeot (from 2003 to 2005). The cigarette brand appeared on helmets and suits of some of the best rally drivers, being personal sponsor of Markku Alén, Timo Salonen, Juha Kankkunen, Miki Biasion and others. Between 1987 and 1992, Marlboro backed Carlos Sainz, appearing on his cars (Ford Sierra in 1987–88 and then Toyota Celica since 1989). In 1993 the cigarette brand started an association with Belgian rally driver Freddy Loix, who was racing for Opel in the Belgian rally championship. Between 1996 and 1998 Loix raced with Toyota Team Belgium in the WRC, carrying the Marlboro livery on his car. In 1999 he moved to Mitsubishi Ralliart works team, with the iconic livery remaining on successive Lancer Evolutions until the marque's temporary WRC withdrawal at the end of 2002.

Marlboro also sponsored the cars of Emirati rally driver Mohammed bin Sulayem and has sponsored a number of rallies including the Safari Rally (between 1982 and 1990), the Rally Argentina, the Rally of Lebanon, the Jordan Rally, and the UAE Desert Challenge.

==== Australian touring car racing ====
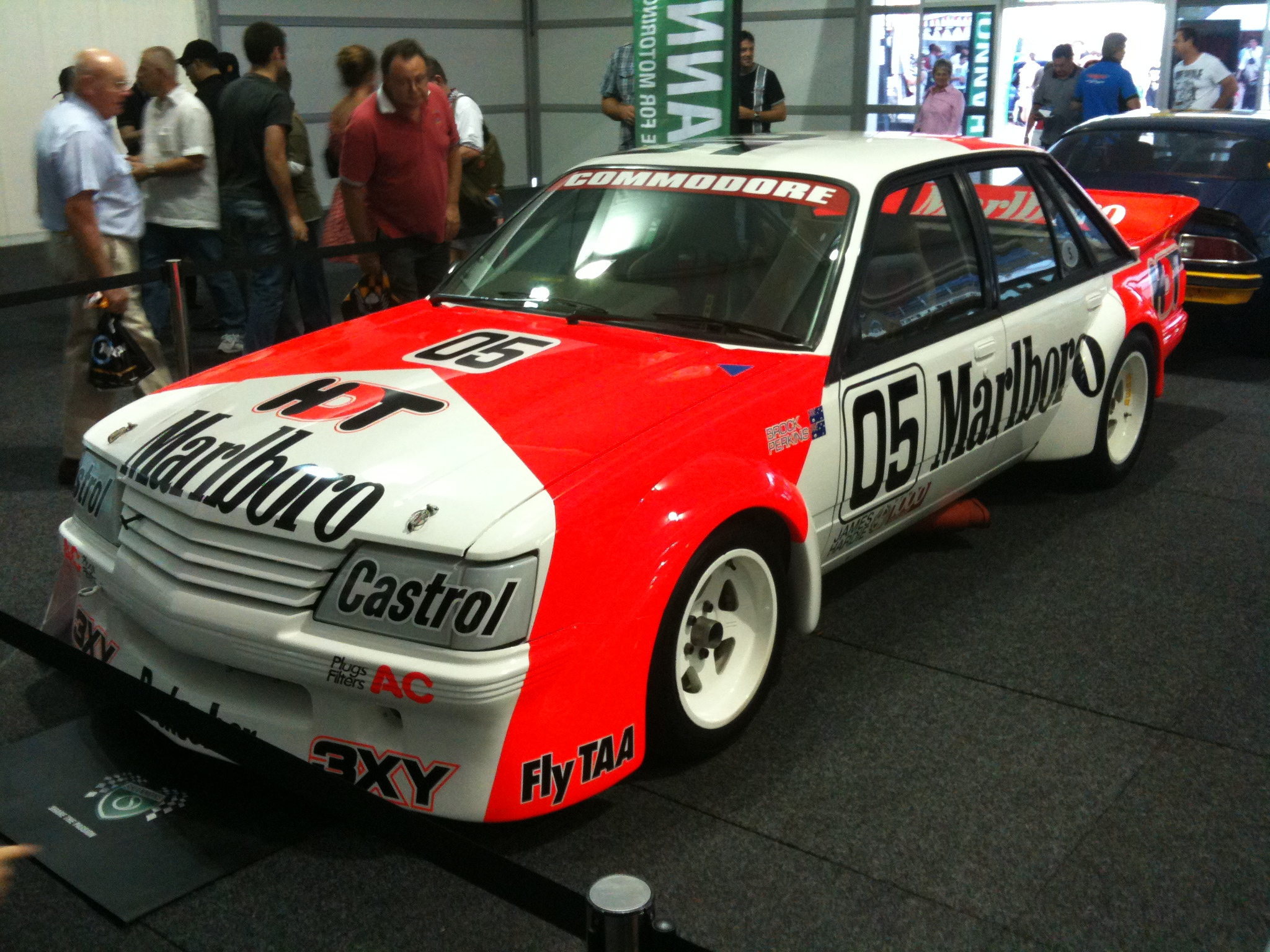
Holden Dealer Team Holden Commodore VK

Marlboro was the naming rights sponsor of the Holden Dealer Team from 1974 until 1984.

==== IMSA SportsCar ====
Marlboro sponsored the Italo-American IMSA SportsCar Le Mans GT team Risi Competizione since 2004 but Risi Competizione opting to invisible the Marlboro logo due to the team respecting Tobacco Master Settlement Agreement regulations and also ban of cigarette advertising in sports.

==== Badminton ====
Marlboro sponsored the Thomas and Uber Cup from 1984 to 1990, as well as the Sudirman Cup from 1991 to 1995 and 2001 to 2013.

== Products ==
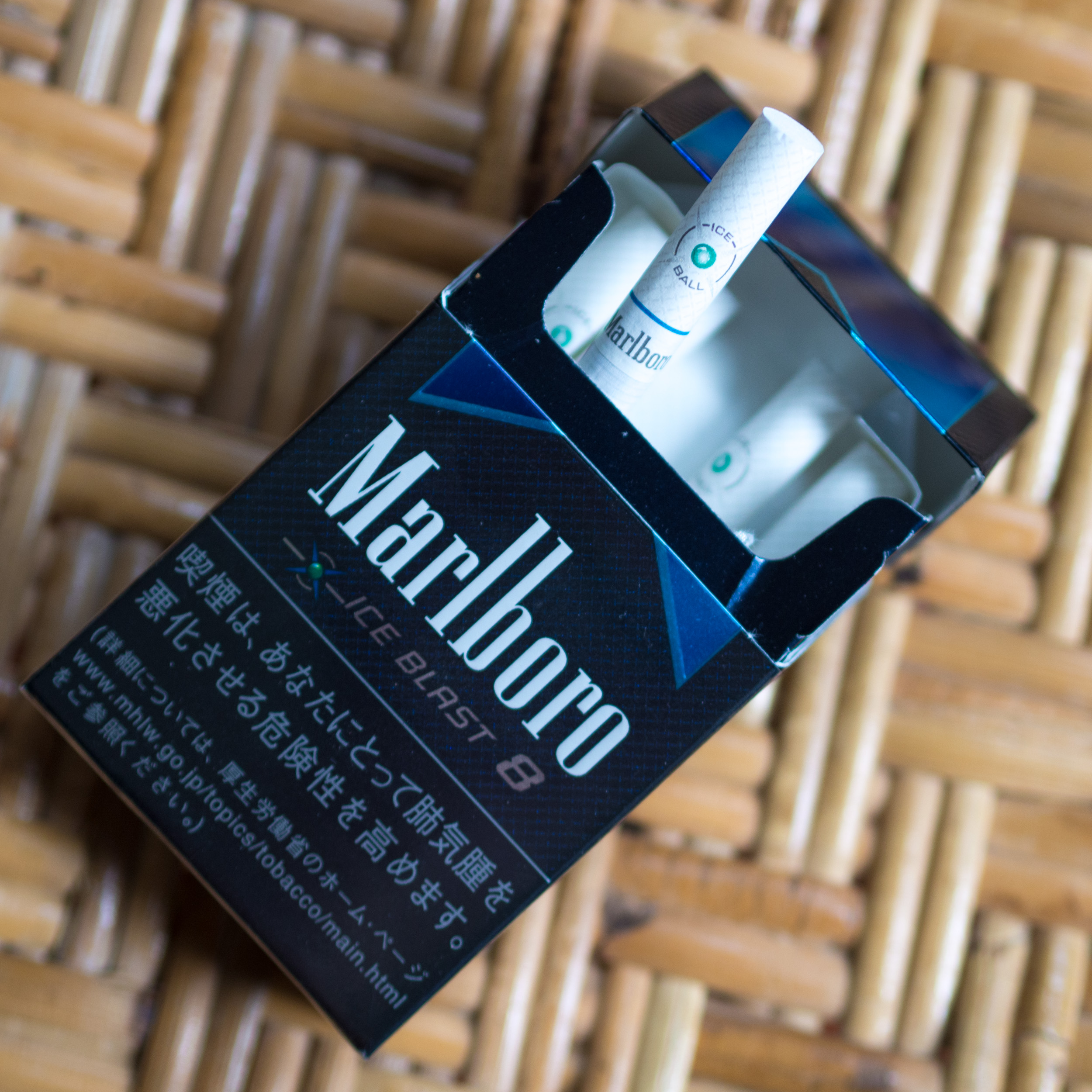
A Japanese pack of Marlboro Ice Blast. This mentholated cigarette also contains a menthol capsule in the filter that can be cracked open by the smoker.

Phillip Morris markets cigarettes, snus, and HeatSticks under the Marlboro brand.

=== International cigarette varieties ===
Philip Morris International organized Marlboro products into three divisions—Flavor line, which are original red full flavor cigarettes, Gold line are former lights, and Fresh line comprises flavored cigarettes.

In the UK, the company sells Marlboro Red, Gold, Touch and Silver King Size. In May 2020, all brands of menthol cigarettes, including Marlboro Menthol and Marlboro Ice Blast Capsule cigarettes were banned in the European Union.

Marlboro cigarette packaging in the Philippines with graphic warning label.

In the Philippines, Marlboro has five cigarette variants: Marlboro Classic (also known as Marlboro Red), Marlboro Gold (first known and well-known as Marlboro Lights), Marlboro Black Menthol (simply Marlboro Black), Marlboro Purple Fusion (or Purple Mix) and Marlboro Ice Blast Mega (known as Marlboro Blue, a companion brand of Fortune Mint Splash in the Philippines).

== Marlboro in Canada ==
Philip Morris sold the Canadian rights to the "Marlboro" name to Imperial Tobacco Canada in 1932. After the brand's successful American relaunch in the 1950s, Philip Morris tried several legal manoeuvres in attempting to reacquire the Canadian rights. Imperial Tobacco continued to sell a line of cigarettes under the Marlboro name in Canada, albeit with different packaging from that of the Philip Morris product. Philip Morris retains the rights to the "rooftop" trade dress and other elements of Marlboro's branding which were developed after the 1932 sale and has used that trade dress in Canada in combination with the names "Matador" or occasionally "Maverick" for a line of Virginia blend cigarettes.

In 2006, Philip Morris International's Canadian affiliate Rothmans, Benson & Hedges introduced a new product with the "rooftop" trade dress, and marked as being the "World Famous Imported Blend", but not bearing any actual brand name. This led to a legal challenge from Imperial, contending that the new packaging created customer confusion by merely suggesting the Marlboro brand, thereby infringing on Imperial's Canadian trademark rights. Canada's Federal Court of Appeal ruled in favor of Imperial in June 2012. The judgment noted that Canadian regulations which (in most cases) prohibit the public display of tobacco products at retail locations – i.e., customers must ask for a brand by name – exacerbated the situation, as there were now two products that customers might be referring to when asking for "Marlboro". Though PMI attempted to appeal the decision, shortly after the ruling it began using the brand name "Rooftop" on packaging for the previously unbranded cigarettes. The Supreme Court of Canada declined to hear PMI's appeal the following year.

== Morley ==
"Morley" is a fictional brand of cigarettes whose packaging resembles Marlboro's original packaging. The fictional brand has appeared in various television shows, films, and video games that otherwise have no apparent connection to each other. The name "Morley" is a play on "Marleys", a nickname for Marlboro cigarettes. Morleys appear at least as far back as 1960, in Alfred Hitchcock's film Psycho. There is also a Morley Lights version, in a gold and white package (similar to Marlboro Lights), marked "Lights".

Morleys were iconically smoked by the Cigarette Smoking Man, a major character of the sci-fi TV series The X-Files. The Morley Cigarettes packet is noted as one of the most recognizable props used throughout the series. The Morley packaging is sold to production companies by the Earl Hays Press, a century-old Hollywood prop packaging service.

Using non-brand name products like Morley cigarettes dates back to early American television. Cigarette companies often sponsored entire TV shows and advertised through product placement, but if no cigarette companies agreed to pay, producers instead used a non-brand product.

== See also ==
- Marlboro Friday, sales campaign
- Health effects of smoking tobacco
