= Placeholder name =

Name substituted for an unknown name

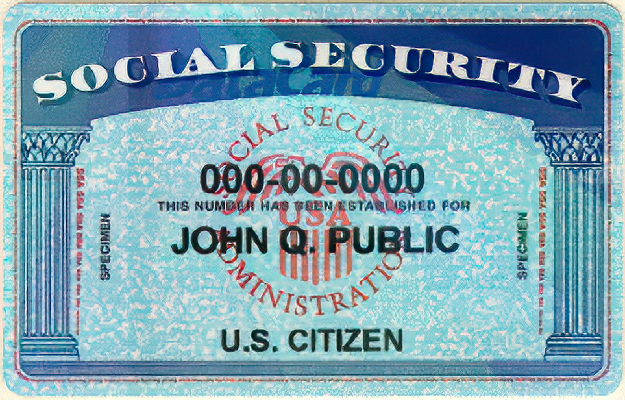
A placeholder name of "John Q. Public" on an example of a social security card

Placeholder names are names used as placeholder words, i.e., referring to things, places, or people, the names of which or of whom do not actually exist; are temporarily forgotten, or are unimportant; or in order to avoid stigmatization, or because they are unknowable or unpredictable given the context of their discussion; or to deliberately expunge direct use of the name. Placeholder names for people are often terms referring to an average person or a predicted persona of a typical user or for an individual whose name is unknown.

Placeholder names serve as a "common language" that provide flexibility and clarity when talking or writing about concepts. Some morphologists "will distinguish between placeholders such as thingummy and placeholder names like John Doe". In computer programming and printing, placeholder names allow a creator to test or visualize the end product. Placeholder names are used in writing, publishing, and typesetting where there are gaps in the text, document, or data set for an unknown name.

== Issues ==
The correct name is usually added once the information is known. However, use of placeholder names has caused problems in circumstances where the placeholder is not thereafter substituted for a real name when it becomes available. For example, in 2009, the United States Army was forced to issue an apology when letters addressed to "John Doe" were sent to thousands of families of soldiers killed in Iraq and Afghanistan. A 2015 report noted that hospitals using a standard "Babyboy" or "Babygirl" placeholder for the first names of unidentified newborns has led to mix-ups in identification and medication of the infants.

== See also ==
- Placeholder word
  - List of placeholder names
  - List of English-language placeholder names for people
  - Alice and Bob
- Metasyntactic variable
- Everyman
- Commoner
- Lorem ipsum
- Fictional company
- Fictional brand
- Evil corporation
- Independent Studio Services § Fictional brands
- Dummy pronoun
- Nonce word
- Expletive attributive
