= Vague language =

Narrative with incomplete or imprecise description

Vague language is a choice of narrative in which the degree of accuracy, certainty, or clarity in a description of a situation or thing is less than it may be possible.

A thorough treatment of vague language, including placeholder words, was provided by Joanna Channell. In particular, she demonstrates that dictionaries often provide inadequate definitions and explanations of vague lexical items.

== See also ==
- Hedge (linguistics)

== Literature ==
- Vague Language Explored, 2007
- Communicating through Vague Language: A Comparative Study of L1 and L2 Speakers, 2016
- Vagueness, Ambiguity, and All the Rest: Linguistic and pragmatic approaches, 2024
