= Earl Hays Press =

Props company in Los Angeles, California

- Industry: Printing; Cinema props
- Founded: 1915
- Founder: Earl Hays
- Headquarters: Los Angeles

The Earl Hays Press is a Los Angeles company providing props to cinema and television productions. The company was established by Earl Hays in 1915 but in the 1960s was sold to employee Ralph Hernandez Senior whose descendants retain ownership. The company specializes in producing generic printed matters such as food packages, documents and advertisements to avoid intellectual property issues with real brands. Earl Hays produces a number of generic newspapers, often these include standard layouts on inside pages, one of which has been featured in hundreds of films and television series. Other notable products are "Morley" cigarette packets, in imitation of the Marlboro brand, and facsimile currency.

== History ==
The company was founded by Earl Hays in 1915 to provide props to Hollywood, Los Angeles, productions. Hays had the idea for the company after making sketches of international vehicle license plates while travelling. By 1944 the business employed a press writer and four printers solely in manufacturing newspapers, magazines and other printed matter for movie studios. Ralph Hernandez Senior joined the firm in 1964 and by the end of the decade had purchased it from Hays. The press is located at a site near Hollywood Burbank Airport. Hernandez's son and grandchildren were also involved in the firm and, by 2023, his grandson Keith Hernandez owned the company. The 2023 Writers Guild of America strike has threatened the future of the business; while the company typically works on around 100 productions simultaneously, during the strike this was reduced to just 2-3. Hernandez has auctioned some of the company's historic rental stock to avoid redundancies.

== Products ==
The Earl Hays Press specialises in "insert printing", ephemera that adds realism to theatrical scenes such as food and beverage packages, menus, magazines, currency, documents, credit cards, DVD and record covers, comic books and advertisements. The company provides non-copyrighted versions of these for productions that cannot afford to or are unwilling to license real products. The company maintains a number of antique printing presses to provide authenticity to its products. In line with Earl Hays' original business the press offers a variety of US and international license plate designs. A stock of around 25,000 items is maintained.

A major product is newspapers tailored to the time period of the setting. The papers are produced with a number of titles and formats to imitate titles ranging from high-end financial papers to small local newspapers. Headlines can be customised to cover plotlines in the production but the article text is usually nonsense and pages are filled with generic photographs and headlines such as "Million Dollar Highway Repair Underway" and "New Government Tower Planned". Inside pages are often to a generic design and one particular layout, including the headline "She's 3rd Brightest But Hard Gal To See" and an image of a brunette woman in a sweater has been noticed in hundreds of films and television shows since the 1970s. A newspaper prop that was created by The Earl Hays Press has been seen in many productions including, Desperate Housewives, Modern Family, Married with Children, Scrubs, No Country for Old Men, Absolute Power, and more.

The Earl Hays Press produces "Morley" cigarette packets. These resemble the copyrighted Marlboro brand and are smoked prominently by the Cigarette Smoking Man in The X-Files, Chandler Bing in Friends and Spike in Buffy the Vampire Slayer. The first known appearance of the Morley brand was in the 1960 film Psycho; they also appear in The Twilight Zone, The Walking Dead, Malcolm in the Middle and Burn Notice. The firm also produces bespoke publications such as the fake adult magazine Playpen that appears in Friends.

The Earl Hays Press also produces fake money for use in productions. These are similar to regular US dollars but contain the signature of the graphic designer rather than the US Treasurer and all have the same serial number. The US Secret Service checks and approves the designs before production to ensure it is sufficiently different from currency in circulation. Despite following this protocol the bills provided by The Earl Hays Press for the production of the 1965 film The Cincinnati Kid caused issues. The fake currency, including $100 bills, used in a poker scene were taken by crew members and distributed in the bars and clubs of New Orleans. The currency entered circulation across the world and the Secret Service required the Earl Hays Press to burn its remaining stock and original printing plates under their supervision.
