= Prop =

Movable object used by actors on a stage or set

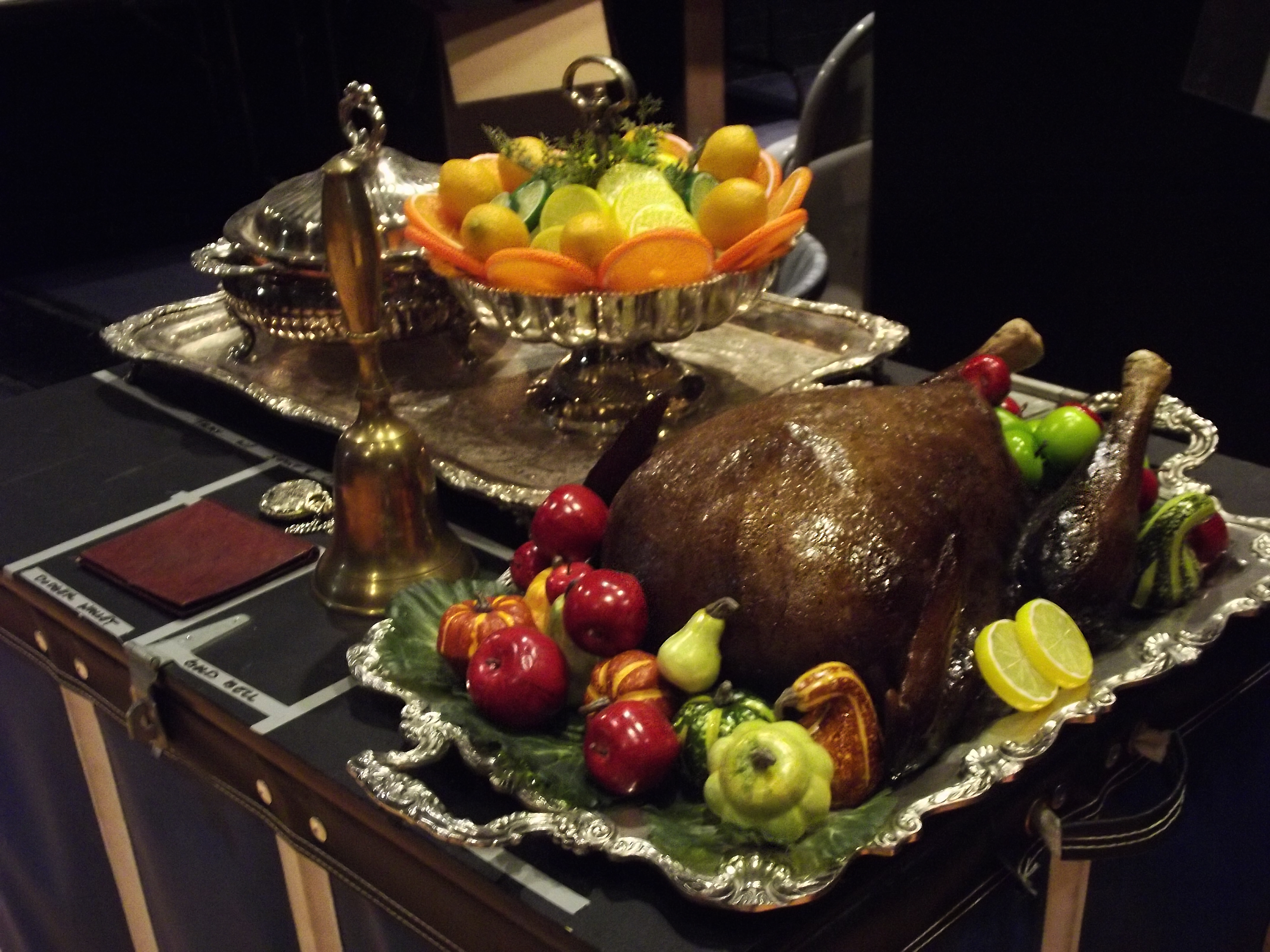
A prop table backstage for the musical number "Food, Glorious Food" in the musical production, Oliver!

A prop, formally known as a theatrical property, is an object an actor uses on stage or screen during a performance or screen production. In practical terms, a prop is considered to be anything movable or portable on a stage or a set, distinct from the actors, scenery, costumes, and electrical equipment. This includes handheld items such as books, cups, weapons, and tools that actors interact with during a performance. Props help to create a realistic setting, convey information, or add to the storytelling by showing details about the characters or the environment.

== Term ==
The earliest known use of the term "properties" in English to refer to stage accessories is in the 1425 CE morality play, The Castle of Perseverance.

During the Renaissance in Europe, small acting troupes functioned as cooperatives, pooling resources and dividing any income. Many performers provided their own costumes and small objects needed for performance, hence the term "property" suggesting these items belonged to the people on stage. Conversely, items such as stage weapons or furniture may have been acquired specially and considered "company property".

The Oxford English Dictionary finds the first usage of "props" in its shortened form in 1841, while the singular form "prop" appeared in 1911.

"Property" and "prop" apply not only to props used in theatre, but also to props used in film and television. Properties director Bland Wade said "A coffee cup onstage is a coffee cup on television, is a coffee cup on the big screen," adding "There are definitely different responsibilities and different vocabulary."

== Backstage and on stage ==
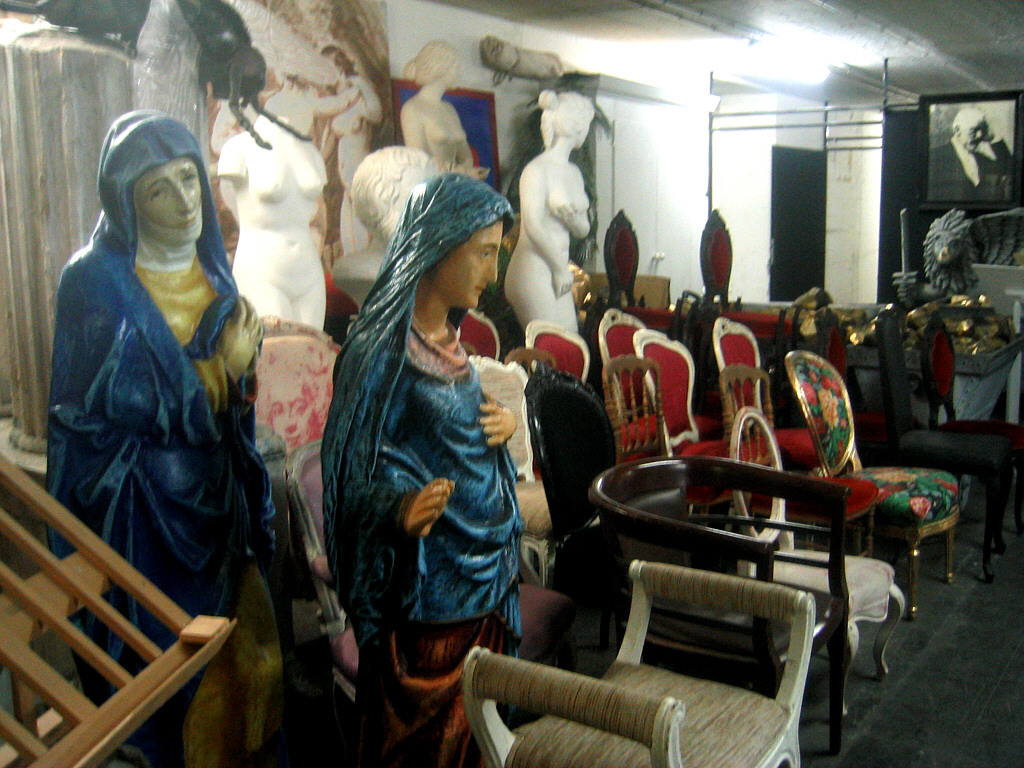
Props storage room of the Mannheim National Theatre, Germany

During a performance props are set up in order, off stage on a table in an easily accessed area or pre-set on-stage before the performance begins by the assistant stage manager (ASM). The person in charge of preparing, maintaining and acquiring props is generally called the property master.

== Types ==
Most props are ordinary objects. Some may require modification, such as rewiring of lamps to be compatible with dimmers or painting to make an object look used or be more visible from front of house under bright or dim lighting.

Props may also be manufactured specially for the production. This may be for reasons of weight, durability and safety or the item may be unique in appearance and/or function.

=== Weapons ===
A prop weapon, such as a gun or sword, can be a replica, a real weapon or a real weapon which has been modified to be non-functional.

To make melee weapons non-functional, swords often have their edges and points dulled. Knives are often made of plastic or rubber or have retractable blades.

Rubber bladed swords and guns may be used by stuntmen or actors where the action does not require detailed or functional weapons, in order to minimise risk.

==== Firearms ====
It is common for functioning firearms to be used in film and television productions usually firing blanks.

Due to the increased level of risk it is standard practice for the safe and proper handling and use of firearms as props to be overseen by a specifically trained and licensed professional, usually called the weapons master or armourer.

Although blank cartridges do not fire projectiles, they still have an explosive charge and can cause fatal injury.

Dummy bullets are used if the prop is in closeup and chambered rounds in the cylinder of a revolver are visible to camera. They can also be used in shots of the actor loading a weapon or merely handling ammunition. Dummy bullets contain no primer or charge and are only "bullet shaped objects"

Although rare, fatal firearm related incidents have occurred, notably Jon-Erik Hexum on October 18, 1984, Brandon Lee on March 31, 1993, and Halyna Hutchins on October 21, 2021.

=== Breakaway ===
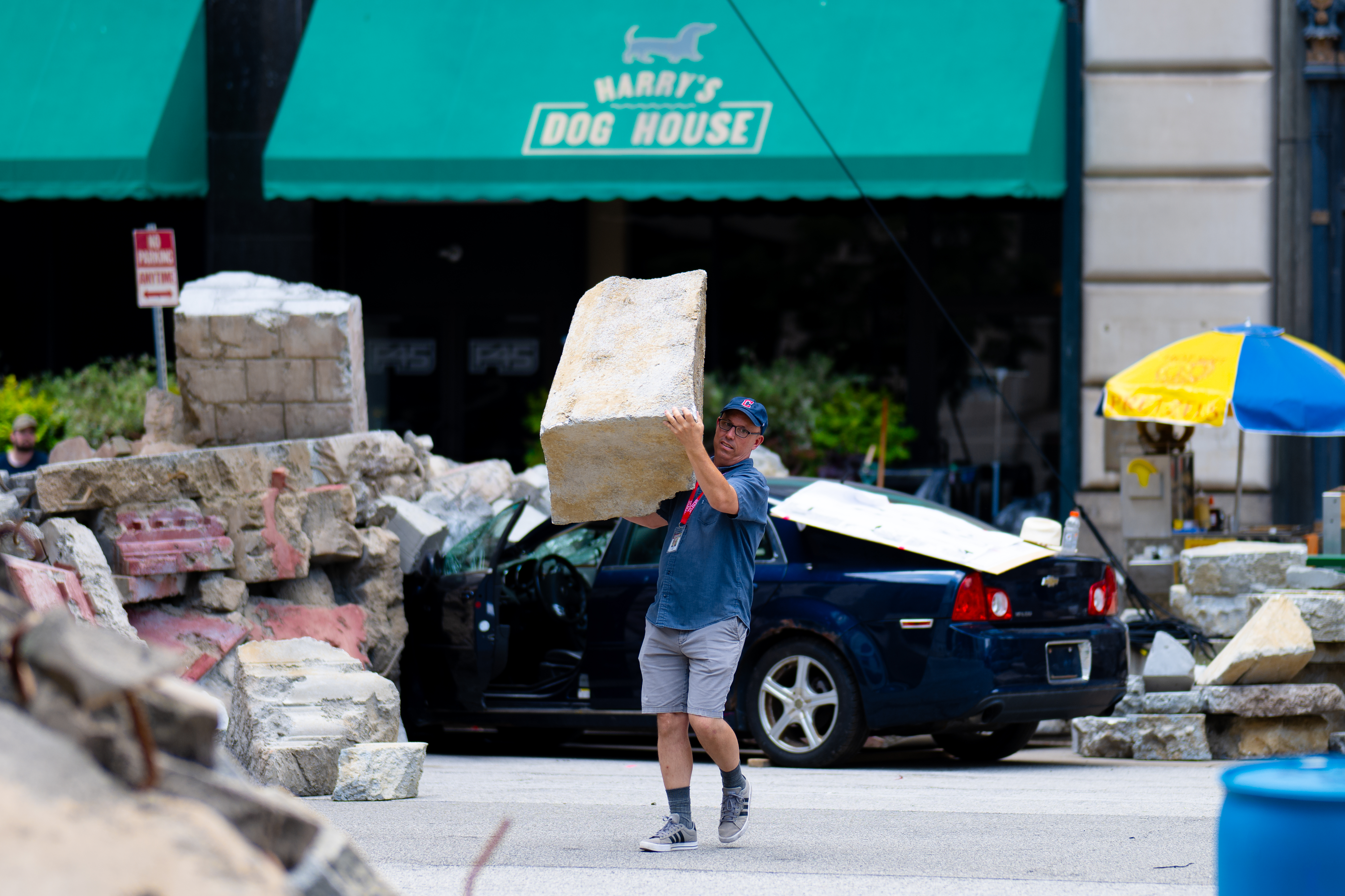
A crew member carries prop concrete debris on the set of Superman.

Breakaway props are designed to be destroyed or break in use, such as furniture made from balsa-wood or cardboard and windows, bottles and glassware made from sugar glass or resin. Cups, plates or vases may be made from bisque or wax.

Although these are relatively safe, a stunt double may replace the main actor for scenes involving their use.

=== Hero ===
Hero props are the more detailed pieces intended for close inspection by the camera or audience. The hero prop may have legible writing, lights, moving parts, or other attributes or functions missing from a standard prop. The name refers to their typical use by main characters in a production.

A hero prop phaser from the Star Trek franchise, for example, might include a depressible trigger and a light-up muzzle and display panel (all of which would make the hero prop more expensive and less durable).

=== Money ===
Although real money can be used, when large quantities are required or the money is to be destroyed, it is usually more practical for facsimiles to be used, which are made to not only look realistic but also comply with counterfeiting laws.

== Collecting ==
In recent years, the increasing popularity of movie memorabilia has elevated many props to the status of prized collector's items. "Screen-used" props can fetch vast sums at auctions and charity benefits.

There is also a growing industry in the making of replicas of well known hero props for home display, cosplay or LARP use.

== See also ==
- Earl Hays Press – Props company in Los Angeles, California
- Stembridge Gun Rentals, a major supplier of prop firearms to the US movie and television industry from 1920 to 2007
- Film memorabilia
