= Fictional company =

Organization existing only in fiction

Fictional companies are often used in books, comics, films, television shows and video games where copyrights or the likely chance of being prosecuted exists from using the name of a real company. They may be used on television in countries where the use of real company names or trademarks is prohibited in dramatic presentations to avoid the possibility of product placement. An example of a generic fictional company is the Acme Corporation. Often, when a fictional company is used, it will be a parody of a real world counterpart, which would avoid any unwanted legal issues.

In other cases, fictional brands have been carried across multiple series and even from movies to TV. Oceanic Airlines first appeared in the 1965 two-parter episode "The Ditching" of the television series Flipper, and has been seen in multiple series and films since including the 1996 film Executive Decision and the 2004–2010 television series Lost.

== See also ==
- Evil corporation
- Fictional brand
