= Lorem ipsum =

Placeholder text used in publishing and graphic design

Using Lorem ipsum to focus attention on graphic elements in a webpage design proposal

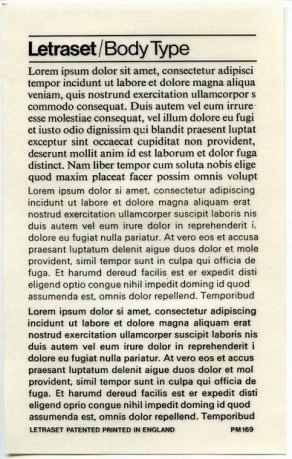
An example of a Lorem ipsum placeholder text on a Letraset sample sheet. Date unknown, possibly 1970s.

Lorem ipsum (/ˌlɔː.rəm ˈɪp.səm/ LOR-əm IP-səm) is a dummy or placeholder text commonly used in graphic design, publishing, and web development. It is typically a corrupted version of De finibus bonorum et malorum, a 1st-century BC text by the Roman statesman and philosopher Cicero, with words altered, added, and removed to make it nonsensical and improper Latin. The first two words are the truncation of dolorem ipsum ("pain itself"). Lorem ipsum's purpose is to permit a page layout to be designed, independently of the copy that will subsequently populate it, or to demonstrate various fonts of a typeface without meaningful text that could be distracting.

Versions of the Lorem ipsum text have been used in typesetting since the late 1960s, when Letraset transfer sheets containing the placeholder text popularized it. Popular word processors, including Pages and Microsoft Word, have since adopted Lorem ipsum, as have many LaTeX packages, web content managers such as Joomla! and WordPress, and CSS libraries such as Semantic UI.

== Example text ==
A common form of Lorem ipsum reads:

Lorem ipsum dolor sit amet, consectetur adipiscing elit, sed do eiusmod tempor incididunt ut labore et dolore magna aliqua. Ut enim ad minim veniam, quis nostrud exercitation ullamco laboris nisi ut aliquip ex ea commodo consequat. Duis aute irure dolor in reprehenderit in voluptate velit esse cillum dolore eu fugiat nulla pariatur. Excepteur sint occaecat cupidatat non proident, sunt in culpa qui officia deserunt mollit anim id est laborum.

== Meaning ==
Despite originating in De finibus, the text has undergone slight changes, notably the cutting off of the do‑ in dolorem and replacing of the suffix in adipiscing and more. As a result of this, the text has no significant meaning in Latin.

== Origin of its modern use ==
The version in use today is derived from Letraset transfer sheets first published in 1966. According to Letraset designer Dave Farey, the text was supplied by British librarian James Mosley as an alternative to the Quousque tandem abutere text from elsewhere in Cicero's writings that had been used in typography manuals since the 1730s. Monotype typographer Dan Rhatigan theorized that the Letraset version deliberately "garbled" the original Latin text to better match the letter frequency of the English language.

In 1985, the Aldus Corporation's first version of the publishing layout software PageMaker included lorem ipsum as a feature.

In 1994, Richard McClintock, a Latin scholar at Hampden–Sydney College, provided what is believed to be the first published explanation of the text's origin. McClintock had connected Lorem ipsum to Cicero's writing sometime before 1982 by searching for recorded uses of the Latin word consectetur, which was rarely used in classical literature. McClintock first published his discovery in a 1994 letter to John McWade, the editor of the Before & After magazine, contesting McWade's earlier claim that Lorem ipsum had no meaning. That letter claimed that the placeholder text had been used since the 1500s, but McClintock admitted in a 2026 interview that that date had been a guess with no evidence to back it up.

== Source text: Cicero's 'De finibus bonorum et malorum' ==
The Lorem ipsum text is derived from sections 1.10.32 and 1.10.33 of Cicero's De finibus bonorum et malorum. The physical source may have been the 1914 Loeb Classical Library edition of De finibus, where the Latin text, presented on the left-hand (even) pages, breaks off on page 34 with "Neque porro quisquam est qui do-" and continues on page 36 with "lorem ipsum ...." The Lorem ipsum text continues with excerpts that appear to generally match the layouts of pages 56, 70, and 118, suggesting that the layout of the Loeb book was the source of the dummy text seen today.

The sections of De finibus bonorum et malorum from which Lorem ipsum ultimately derives is one in which Cicero proposes that pleasure be obtained rationally rather than impulsively. (Note: He records a conversation in his home city of Cumae between himself and Lucius Manlius Torquatus, a young Epicurean, while another young Roman, Gaius Valerius Triarius, listens on.) The relevant sections as printed in the source is reproduced below, with fragments used in Lorem ipsum underlined. Letters in square brackets were added to Lorem ipsum and were not present in the source text:

[32] Sed ut perspiciatis, unde omnis iste natus error sit voluptatem accusantium doloremque laudantium, totam rem aperiam eaque ipsa, quae ab illo inventore veritatis et quasi architecto beatae vitae dicta sunt, explicabo. Nemo enim ipsam voluptatem, quia voluptas sit, aspernatur aut odit aut fugit, sed quia consequuntur magni dolores eos, qui ratione voluptatem sequi nesciunt, neque porro quisquam est, qui dolorem ipsum, quia dolor sit amet consectetur adipisci[ng] velit, sed quia non numquam [do] eius modi tempora inci[di]dunt, ut labore et dolore magnam aliquam quaerat voluptatem. Ut enim ad minima veniam, quis nostrum[d] exercitationem ullam corporis suscipit laboriosam, nisi ut aliquid ex ea commodi consequatur? [D]Quis autem vel eum i[r]ure reprehenderit, qui in ea voluptate velit esse, quam nihil molestiae consequatur, vel illum, qui dolorem eum fugiat, quo voluptas nulla pariatur?

[33] At vero eos et accusamus et iusto odio dignissimos ducimus, qui blanditiis praesentium voluptatum deleniti atque corrupti, quos dolores et quas molestias excepturi sint, obcaecati cupiditate non provident, similique sunt in culpa, qui officia deserunt mollitia animi, id est laborum et dolorum fuga. Et harum quidem reru[d]um facilis est e[r]t expedita distinctio. Nam libero tempore, cum soluta nobis est eligendi optio, cumque nihil impedit, quo minus id, quod maxime placeat facere possimus, omnis voluptas assumenda est, omnis dolor repellend[a]us. Temporibus autem quibusdam et aut officiis debitis aut rerum necessitatibus saepe eveniet, ut et voluptates repudiandae sint et molestiae non recusandae. Itaque earum rerum hic tenetur a sapiente delectus, ut aut reiciendis voluptatibus maiores alias consequatur aut perferendis doloribus asperiores repellat.

What follows is an English translation by Harris Rackham as printed in the 1914 Loeb edition, with words at least partially represented in Lorem ipsum underlined:

[32] But I must explain to you how all this mistaken idea of reprobating pleasure and extolling pain arose. To do so, I will give you a complete account of the system and expound the teachings of the great explorer of the truth, the master-builder of human happiness. No one rejects, dislikes or avoids pleasure itself, because it is pleasure, but because those who do not know how to pursue pleasure rationally encounter extremely painful consequences. Nor again is there anyone who loves or pursues or desires to obtain pain of itself, because it is pain, but occasionally circumstances occur in which toil and pain can procure him some great pleasure. To take a trivial example, which of us ever undertakes laborious physical exercise, except to obtain some advantage? But who has any right to find fault with a man who chooses to enjoy a pleasure that has no annoying consequences, or one who avoids a pain that produces no resultant pleasure?

[33] On the other hand, we denounce with righteous indignation and dislike men who are so beguiled and demoralized by the charms of pleasure of the moment, so blinded by desire, that they cannot foresee the pain and trouble that are bound to ensue; and equal blame belongs to those who fail in their duty through weakness of will, which is the same as saying through shrinking from toil and pain. These cases are perfectly simple and easy to distinguish. In a free hour, when our power of choice is untrammeled and nothing prevents us from being what we like best, every pleasure is welcomed and every pain avoided. But in certain circumstances and owing to the claims of duty or the obligations of business it will frequently occur that pleasures must be repudiated and annoyances accepted. The wise man, therefore, always holds in these matters to this principle of selection: he rejects pleasures to secure other greater pleasures, or else he endures pains to avoid worse pains.

== See also ==
- Asemic writing – Wordless open semantic form of writing
- Etaoin shrdlu – Common metal-type printing error
- Gibberish – Nonsensical speech or writing
- Hamburgevons – Text used as a sample for assessing fonts
- Indian-head test pattern – Television test card
- Lenna – Standard test image
- Li Europan lingues – Placeholder text in Interlingue
- Metasyntactic variable – Placeholder term used in computer science
- Pangram – Sentence that uses every letter of a language's alphabet
  - The quick brown fox jumps over the lazy dog – Sentence containing all letters of the English alphabet
- Shibboleth – Custom or tradition that distinguishes one group from another
- "To come" – Phrase used in publishing to indicate missing material
- Utah teapot – Computer graphics 3D reference and test model
