= List of counties in West Virginia =

Counties of West Virginia
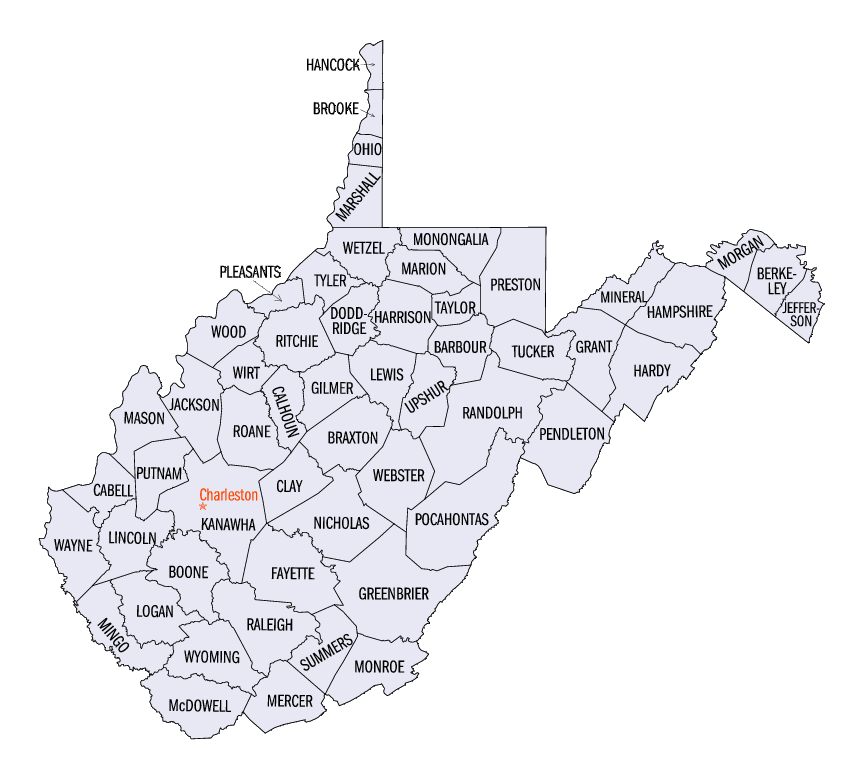
- West Virginia counties (clickable map)
- Location: State of West Virginia
- Number: 55
- Populations: 4,879 (Wirt) – 172,381 (Kanawha)
- Areas: 83 square miles (210 km^{2}) (Hancock) – 1,040 square miles (2,700 km^{2}) (Randolph)
- Government: County government
- Subdivisions: Cities, towns, unincorporated communities, census-designated places

The U.S. state of West Virginia has 55 counties. Fifty of them existed at the time of the Wheeling Convention in 1861, during the American Civil War, when those counties seceded from the Commonwealth of Virginia to form the new state of West Virginia. West Virginia was admitted as a separate state of the United States on June 20, 1863. Five additional counties (Grant, Mineral, Lincoln, Summers, and Mingo) were formed from the original counties in the decades following admission.

After the Civil War, Berkeley County and Jefferson County, the two easternmost counties of West Virginia, refused to recognize their inclusion in the state, and the Virginia General Assembly passed legislation attempting to reclaim them. In March 1866, the United States Congress passed a joint mandate assenting to their inclusion in the new state, and the Supreme Court of the United States confirmed this outcome in the case of Virginia v. West Virginia (1871).

The West Virginia Constitution was ratified in 1872, replacing the state constitution created in 1863 when West Virginia became a state. Article 9, Section 8, of the West Virginia Constitution permits the creation of additional counties if a majority of citizens in the proposed new county vote for its creation and the new county has a minimum area of 400 square miles (1,036 km^{2}) and a population of at least 6,000. Creation of a new county is prohibited if it would bring another county below these thresholds. Three counties (Greenbrier, Kanawha, and Randolph) have sufficient population (based on the 2020 United States Census) and land area to allow a new county to be split off. The remaining counties cannot be split, as either their land area would decrease to under 400 square miles, or their population would decrease to below 6,000.

The role of counties in local government had been minimized under the 1863 constitution, which vested most local government authority in a system of townships based on the New England model. The authors of the 1872 constitution chose to return to the system used in Virginia, in which each county was governed by a county court with combined authority for executive, legislative, and judicial functions of the county government. In 1880, West Virginia amended its constitution and replaced the county court system with an arrangement that divides county government powers between seven county offices, each of which is independently elected: the county commission, county clerk, circuit clerk, county sheriff, county assessor, county prosecuting attorney, and county surveyor of lands. Counties have only those powers that are expressly granted to them by the state Constitution or by state statute. These powers include, but are not limited to, maintaining the infrastructure of the state, funding libraries, maintaining jails and hospitals, and waste disposal. Reforming public education became a county function in 1933. In May 1933, a county unit plan was adopted. Under this plan, the state's 398 school districts were consolidated into the current 55 county school systems. This enabled public schools to be funded more economically and saved West Virginia millions of dollars.

Randolph County is the largest by area at 1,040 square miles (2,694 km^{2}), and Hancock County is the smallest at 83 square miles (215 km^{2}). Kanawha County contributed land to the founding of 12 West Virginia counties and has the largest population (172,381 in 2025). Wirt County has the smallest population (4,879 in 2025). The oldest county is Hampshire, established in 1754, and the newest is Mingo, established in 1895. Spruce Knob, located in Pendleton County, is the state's highest point at 4,863 feet (1,482 m). Federal Information Processing Standard (FIPS) codes, which are used by the United States government to identify counties uniquely, are five-digit numbers. For West Virginia, they start with 54 and end with the three-digit county code (for example, Barbour County has FIPS code 54001). Each county's code is provided in the table below, linked to census data for that county.

== Counties ==
| County | FIPS code | County seat | Est. | Origin | Etymology | Population | Area | Map |
|---|---|---|---|---|---|---|---|---|
| Barbour County | 001 | Philippi | March 3, 1843 | Harrison, Lewis, and Randolph counties | Philip P. Barbour (1783–1841); United States Speaker of the House (1821–23) | 15,414 | 341 sq mi (883 km^{2}) | State map highlighting Barbour County |
| Berkeley County | 003 | Martinsburg | May 15, 1772 | Frederick County (Virginia) | Norborne Berkeley (1717–70); Royal Governor of Virginia (1768–70) | 139,522 | 321 sq mi (831 km^{2}) | State map highlighting Berkeley County |
| Boone County | 005 | Madison | March 11, 1847 | Cabell, Kanawha, and Logan counties | Daniel Boone (1734–1820); American frontiersman | 20,251 | 503 sq mi (1,303 km^{2}) | State map highlighting Boone County |
| Braxton County | 007 | Sutton | January 15, 1836 | Kanawha, Lewis, and Nicholas counties | Carter Braxton (1736–97); Signer of the Declaration of Independence | 11,885 | 514 sq mi (1,331 km^{2}) | State map highlighting Braxton County |
| Brooke County | 009 | Wellsburg | May 1, 1797 | Ohio County | Robert Brooke (1761–1800); Governor of Virginia (1794–96) | 21,142 | 89 sq mi (231 km^{2}) | State map highlighting Brooke County |
| Cabell County | 011 | Huntington | January 2, 1809 | Kanawha County | William H. Cabell (1772–1853); Governor of Virginia (1805–08) | 91,183 | 282 sq mi (730 km^{2}) | State map highlighting Cabell County |
| Calhoun County | 013 | Grantsville | March 5, 1856 | Gilmer County | John C. Calhoun (1782–1850); United States Vice President (1825–32) | 5,978 | 281 sq mi (728 km^{2}) | State map highlighting Calhoun County |
| Clay County | 015 | Clay | March 29, 1858 | Braxton and Nicholas counties | Henry Clay (1777–1852); United States Senator Kentucky (1823–25); United States Speaker of the House (1849–52) | 7,538 | 342 sq mi (886 km^{2}) | State map highlighting Clay County |
| Doddridge County | 017 | West Union | February 4, 1845 | Harrison, Lewis, Ritchie, and Tyler counties | Philip Doddridge (1773–1832); United States Congressman (Virginia) (1829–32) | 7,634 | 320 sq mi (829 km^{2}) | State map highlighting Doddridge County |
| Fayette County | 019 | Fayetteville | February 28, 1831 | Kanawha, Greenbrier, Logan, and Nicholas counties | Marquis de Lafayette (1757–1834); French-born American Revolutionary War General | 38,165 | 664 sq mi (1,720 km^{2}) | State map highlighting Fayette County |
| Gilmer County | 021 | Glenville | February 3, 1845 | Kanawha and Lewis counties | Thomas Walker Gilmer (1802–44); United States Secretary of the Navy (1844); Governor of Virginia (1840–41) | 7,085 | 340 sq mi (881 km^{2}) | State map highlighting Gilmer County |
| Grant County | 023 | Petersburg | February 14, 1866 | Hardy County | Ulysses S. Grant (1822–85); United States President (1869–77) | 11,041 | 477 sq mi (1,235 km^{2}) | State map highlighting Grant County |
| Greenbrier County | 025 | Lewisburg | March 1, 1778 | Montgomery County (Virginia) and Botetourt County (Virginia) | Greenbrier River | 31,578 | 1,021 sq mi (2,644 km^{2}) | State map highlighting Greenbrier County |
| Hampshire County | 027 | Romney | May 1, 1754 | Augusta County (Virginia) and Frederick County (Virginia) | County of Hampshire in England | 24,105 | 642 sq mi (1,663 km^{2}) | State map highlighting Hampshire County |
| Hancock County | 029 | New Cumberland | January 15, 1848 | Brooke County | John Hancock (1737–93); One of the Signers of the Declaration of Independence; Governor of Massachusetts (1780–85) and (1787–93) | 27,729 | 83 sq mi (215 km^{2}) | State map highlighting Hancock County |
| Hardy County | 031 | Moorefield | February 1, 1786 | Hampshire County | Samuel Hardy (1758–85); Virginia delegate to the Continental Congress (1783–85) | 14,337 | 583 sq mi (1,510 km^{2}) | State map highlighting Hardy County |
| Harrison County | 033 | Clarksburg | July 20, 1784 | Monongalia County | Benjamin Harrison V (1726–91); Governor of Virginia (1781–84) | 64,221 | 416 sq mi (1,077 km^{2}) | State map highlighting Harrison County |
| Jackson County | 035 | Ripley | March 1, 1831 | Kanawha, Mason, and Wood counties | Andrew Jackson (1767–1845); United States President (1829–37) | 27,450 | 466 sq mi (1,207 km^{2}) | State map highlighting Jackson County |
| Jefferson County | 037 | Charles Town | October 26, 1801 | Berkeley County | Thomas Jefferson (1743–1826); United States President (1801–09) | 63,102 | 210 sq mi (544 km^{2}) | State map highlighting Jefferson County |
| Kanawha County | 039 | Charleston | October 1, 1789 | Greenbrier and Montgomery County (Virginia) | Kanawha River | 172,381 | 903 sq mi (2,339 km^{2}) | State map highlighting Kanawha County |
| Lewis County | 041 | Weston | December 18, 1816 | Harrison County | Charles Lewis (1736–74); American Colonel killed at the Battle of Point Pleasant | 16,394 | 389 sq mi (1,008 km^{2}) | State map highlighting Lewis County |
| Lincoln County | 043 | Hamlin | February 23, 1867 | Boone, Cabell, Kanawha, and Putnam counties | Abraham Lincoln (1809–65); United States President (1861–65) | 19,177 | 438 sq mi (1,134 km^{2}) | State map highlighting Lincoln County |
| Logan County | 045 | Logan | January 12, 1824 | Cabell and Kanawha counties, Giles County (Virginia), and Tazewell County (Virginia) | Chief Logan (c. 1723-80); Mingo leader | 30,375 | 454 sq mi (1,176 km^{2}) | State map highlighting Logan County |
| Marion County | 049 | Fairmont | January 14, 1842 | Harrison and Monongalia counties | Francis Marion (1732–95); American Revolutionary War General (1757–82) | 55,584 | 310 sq mi (803 km^{2}) | State map highlighting Marion County |
| Marshall County | 051 | Moundsville | May 1, 1835 | Ohio County | John Marshall (1755–1835); United States Secretary of State (1800–01); Chief Justice of the United States (1801–35) | 29,159 | 307 sq mi (795 km^{2}) | State map highlighting Marshall County |
| Mason County | 053 | Point Pleasant | May 1, 1804 | Kanawha County | George Mason (1725–92); United States Constitutional Convention "Father of the Bill of Rights" | 24,707 | 432 sq mi (1,119 km^{2}) | State map highlighting Mason County |
| McDowell County | 047 | Welch | February 20, 1858 | Tazewell County (Virginia) | James McDowell (1795–1851); Governor of Virginia (1843–46) | 16,878 | 535 sq mi (1,386 km^{2}) | State map highlighting McDowell County |
| Mercer County | 055 | Princeton | March 17, 1837 | Giles County (Virginia) and Tazewell County (Virginia) | Hugh Mercer (1726–77); American Revolutionary War General (1775–76) | 57,503 | 420 sq mi (1,088 km^{2}) | State map highlighting Mercer County |
| Mineral County | 057 | Keyser | February 1, 1866 | Hampshire County | abundant mineral resources | 26,792 | 328 sq mi (850 km^{2}) | State map highlighting Mineral County |
| Mingo County | 059 | Williamson | January 30, 1895 | Logan County | Mingo Native Americans | 21,455 | 423 sq mi (1,096 km^{2}) | State map highlighting Mingo County |
| Monongalia County | 061 | Morgantown | November 8, 1776 | Augusta County (Virginia) | Latin derivation for Monongahela River | 107,991 | 361 sq mi (935 km^{2}) | State map highlighting Monongalia County |
| Monroe County | 063 | Union | May 1, 1799 | Greenbrier County | James Monroe (1758–1831); United States Senator (Virginia) (1790–94); Governor of Virginia (1799–1802) and (1811); United States President (1817–25) | 12,491 | 473 sq mi (1,225 km^{2}) | State map highlighting Monroe County |
| Morgan County | 065 | Berkeley Springs | February 9, 1820 | Berkeley and Hampshire counties | Daniel Morgan (1736–1802); United States Congressman (Virginia) (1797–99) | 18,027 | 229 sq mi (593 km^{2}) | State map highlighting Morgan County |
| Nicholas County | 067 | Summersville | January 30, 1818 | Greenbrier, Kanawha, and Randolph counties | Wilson Cary Nicholas (1761–1820); United States Senator (Virginia) (1799–1804); Governor of Virginia (1814–16) | 23,848 | 649 sq mi (1,681 km^{2}) | State map highlighting Nicholas County |
| Ohio County | 069 | Wheeling | November 8, 1776 | Augusta County (Virginia) | Ohio River | 40,496 | 106 sq mi (275 km^{2}) | State map highlighting Ohio County |
| Pendleton County | 071 | Franklin | May 1, 1788 | Augusta County (Virginia), Rockingham County (Virginia), and Hardy | Edmund Pendleton (1721–1803); First Continental Congress (1774) | 5,826 | 698 sq mi (1,808 km^{2}) | State map highlighting Pendleton County |
| Pleasants County | 073 | Saint Marys | March 29, 1851 | Ritchie, Tyler, and Wood counties | James Pleasants, Jr. (1769–1836); United States Senator (Virginia) (1819–22); Governor of Virginia (1822–25) | 7,338 | 131 sq mi (339 km^{2}) | State map highlighting Pleasants County |
| Pocahontas County | 075 | Marlinton | December 21, 1821 | Bath County (Virginia), Pendleton, and Randolph | Pocahontas (c. 1595–1617); Powhatan Native American | 7,602 | 940 sq mi (2,435 km^{2}) | State map highlighting Pocahontas County |
| Preston County | 077 | Kingwood | January 19, 1818 | Monongalia County | James Patton Preston (1774–1843); Governor of Virginia (1816–19) | 34,004 | 648 sq mi (1,678 km^{2}) | State map highlighting Preston County |
| Putnam County | 079 | Winfield | March 11, 1848 | Cabell, Kanawha, and Mason counties | Israel Putnam (1718–90); American Revolutionary War General | 56,885 | 346 sq mi (896 km^{2}) | State map highlighting Putnam County |
| Raleigh County | 081 | Beckley | January 23, 1850 | Fayette County | Sir Walter Raleigh (1554–1618); English explorer and poet | 71,775 | 607 sq mi (1,572 km^{2}) | State map highlighting Raleigh County |
| Randolph County | 083 | Elkins | May 1, 1787 | Harrison County | Edmund Jennings Randolph (1753–1813); Governor of Virginia (1786–88); First United States Attorney General (1789–94) | 26,882 | 1,040 sq mi (2,694 km^{2}) | State map highlighting Randolph County |
| Ritchie County | 085 | Harrisville | February 18, 1843 | Harrison, Lewis, and Wood counties | Thomas Ritchie (1778–1854) nationally influential Virginia newspaper publisher | 8,034 | 454 sq mi (1,176 km^{2}) | State map highlighting Ritchie County |
| Roane County | 087 | Spencer | March 11, 1856 | Gilmer, Jackson, and Kanawha counties | Spencer Roane (1762–1822); Virginia Supreme Court Justice (1794–1822) | 13,317 | 484 sq mi (1,254 km^{2}) | State map highlighting Roane County |
| Summers County | 089 | Hinton | February 27, 1871 | Fayette, Greenbrier, Mercer, and Monroe counties | George W. Summers (1804–68); United States Congressman (Virginia) (1843) | 11,532 | 361 sq mi (935 km^{2}) | State map highlighting Summers County |
| Taylor County | 091 | Grafton | January 19, 1844 | Barbour, Harrison, Marion counties | John Taylor of Caroline (1753–1824); United States Senator (Virginia) (1792–94) and (1803) and (1822–24) | 16,287 | 173 sq mi (448 km^{2}) | State map highlighting Taylor County |
| Tucker County | 093 | Parsons | March 7, 1856 | Randolph County | Henry St. George Tucker (1780–1848); United States Congressman (Virginia) (1815–19); Virginia Supreme Court (1831–41) | 6,540 | 419 sq mi (1,085 km^{2}) | State map highlighting Tucker County |
| Tyler County | 095 | Middlebourne | December 6, 1814 | Ohio County | John Tyler, Sr. (1747–1813); Governor of Virginia (1808–11) | 7,881 | 258 sq mi (668 km^{2}) | State map highlighting Tyler County |
| Upshur County | 097 | Buckhannon | March 26, 1851 | Barbour, Lewis, and Randolph counties | Abel Parker Upshur (1790–1844); United States Secretary of the Navy (1841–43); United States Secretary of State (1843–44) | 23,758 | 355 sq mi (919 km^{2}) | State map highlighting Upshur County |
| Wayne County | 099 | Wayne | January 18, 1842 | Cabell County | "Mad" Anthony Wayne; Major General (1745–96); American Revolutionary War (1775–83) and (1792–96); United States Congressman Georgia (1791) | 37,309 | 506 sq mi (1,311 km^{2}) | State map highlighting Wayne County |
| Webster County | 101 | Webster Springs | January 10, 1860 | Braxton, Nicholas, and Randolph counties | Daniel Webster (1782–1852); United States Senator Massachusetts (1827–41) and (1845–50); United States Secretary of State (1841–53) and (1850–52) | 7,760 | 556 sq mi (1,440 km^{2}) | State map highlighting Webster County |
| Wetzel County | 103 | New Martinsville | January 10, 1846 | Tyler County | Lewis Wetzel (1763–1808) noted frontiersman | 13,734 | 359 sq mi (930 km^{2}) | State map highlighting Wetzel County |
| Wirt County | 105 | Elizabeth | January 19, 1848 | Jackson and Wood counties | William Wirt (1772–1834); United States Attorney General (1817–29) | 4,879 | 233 sq mi (603 km^{2}) | State map highlighting Wirt County |
| Wood County | 107 | Parkersburg | May 1, 1799 | Harrison County | James Wood (1741–1813); Governor of Virginia (1796–99) | 82,385 | 367 sq mi (951 km^{2}) | State map highlighting Wood County |
| Wyoming County | 109 | Pineville | January 26, 1850 | Logan County | derived from Lenape Native American term for "wide plain" | 19,801 | 501 sq mi (1,298 km^{2}) | State map highlighting Wyoming County |

== Racial / Ethnic Profile of counties in West Virginia (2020 Census) ==
Racial / Ethnic Profile of counties in West Virginia (2020 Census)
Following is a table of counties in West Virginia by race/ethnicity. The majority racial/ethnic group is coded per the key below.

| Majority minority with no dominant group |
| Majority White |
| Majority Black |
| Majority Hispanic |
| Majority Asian |
| Majority Native American |

Racial and ethnic composition of counties in West Virginia (2020 Census) (NH = Non-Hispanic) Note: the US Census treats Hispanic/Latino as an ethnic category. This table excludes Latinos from the racial categories and assigns them to a separate category. Hispanics/Latinos may be of any race.
| County | Location of County | Total Population | White alone (NH) | % | Black or African American alone (NH) | % | Native American or Alaska Native alone (NH) | % | Asian alone (NH) | % | Pacific Islander alone (NH) | % | Other race alone (NH) | % | Mixed race or Multiracial (NH) | % | Hispanic or Latino (any race) | % |
|---|---|---|---|---|---|---|---|---|---|---|---|---|---|---|---|---|---|---|
| Barbour | | 15,465 | 14,379 | 92.98% | 259 | 1.67% | 37 | 0.24% | 32 | 0.21% | 0 | 0.00% | 10 | 0.06% | 556 | 3.60% | 192 | 1.24% |
| Berkeley | | 122,076 | 96,559 | 79.10% | 9,118 | 7.47% | 284 | 0.23% | 1,445 | 1.18% | 43 | 0.04% | 511 | 0.42% | 7,223 | 5.92% | 6,893 | 5.65% |
| Boone | | 21,809 | 20,712 | 94.97% | 135 | 0.62% | 39 | 0.18% | 36 | 0.17% | 2 | 0.01% | 18 | 0.08% | 734 | 3.37% | 133 | 0.61% |
| Braxton | | 12,447 | 11,939 | 95.92% | 50 | 0.40% | 19 | 0.15% | 23 | 0.18% | 11 | 0.09% | 15 | 0.12% | 305 | 2.45% | 85 | 0.68% |
| Brooke | | 22,559 | 20,792 | 92.17% | 365 | 1.62% | 36 | 0.16% | 55 | 0.24% | 0 | 0.00% | 70 | 0.31% | 954 | 4.23% | 287 | 1.27% |
| Cabell | | 94,350 | 82,095 | 87.01% | 4,751 | 5.04% | 185 | 0.20% | 1,328 | 1.41% | 20 | 0.02% | 298 | 0.32% | 4,111 | 4.36% | 1,562 | 1.66% |
| Calhoun | | 6,229 | 5,976 | 95.94% | 13 | 0.21% | 12 | 0.19% | 12 | 0.19% | 2 | 0.03% | 2 | 0.03% | 164 | 2.63% | 48 | 0.77% |
| Clay | | 8,051 | 7,651 | 95.03% | 11 | 0.14% | 29 | 0.36% | 13 | 0.16% | 0 | 0.00% | 1 | 0.01% | 294 | 3.65% | 52 | 0.65% |
| Doddridge | | 7,808 | 7,290 | 93.37% | 174 | 2.23% | 15 | 0.19% | 15 | 0.19% | 0 | 0.00% | 15 | 0.19% | 222 | 2.84% | 77 | 0.99% |
| Fayette | | 40,488 | 36,308 | 89.68% | 1,662 | 4.10% | 100 | 0.25% | 105 | 0.26% | 1 | 0.00% | 114 | 0.28% | 1,673 | 4.13% | 525 | 1.30% |
| Gilmer | | 7,408 | 6,026 | 81.34% | 923 | 12.46% | 11 | 0.15% | 30 | 0.40% | 0 | 0.00% | 1 | 0.01% | 173 | 2.34% | 244 | 3.29% |
| Grant | | 10,976 | 10,463 | 95.33% | 83 | 0.76% | 21 | 0.19% | 24 | 0.22% | 0 | 0.00% | 20 | 0.18% | 274 | 2.50% | 91 | 0.83% |
| Greenbrier | | 32,977 | 30,199 | 91.58% | 766 | 2.32% | 55 | 0.17% | 192 | 0.58% | 5 | 0.02% | 88 | 0.27% | 1,101 | 3.34% | 571 | 1.73% |
| Hampshire | | 23,093 | 21,655 | 93.77% | 178 | 0.77% | 30 | 0.13% | 61 | 0.26% | 4 | 0.02% | 74 | 0.32% | 754 | 3.27% | 337 | 1.46% |
| Hancock | | 29,095 | 26,484 | 91.03% | 695 | 2.39% | 31 | 0.11% | 110 | 0.38% | 8 | 0.03% | 74 | 0.25% | 1,269 | 4.36% | 424 | 1.46% |
| Hardy | | 14,299 | 12,685 | 88.71% | 403 | 2.82% | 16 | 0.11% | 53 | 0.37% | 0 | 0.00% | 31 | 0.22% | 452 | 3.16% | 659 | 4.61% |
| Harrison | | 65,921 | 59,862 | 90.81% | 1,104 | 1.67% | 135 | 0.20% | 489 | 0.74% | 28 | 0.04% | 152 | 0.23% | 2,748 | 4.17% | 1,403 | 2.13% |
| Jackson | | 27,791 | 26,411 | 95.03% | 100 | 0.36% | 43 | 0.15% | 91 | 0.33% | 2 | 0.01% | 62 | 0.22% | 852 | 3.07% | 230 | 0.83% |
| Jefferson | | 57,701 | 45,784 | 79.35% | 3,379 | 5.86% | 104 | 0.18% | 817 | 1.42% | 10 | 0.02% | 304 | 0.53% | 3,166 | 5.49% | 4,137 | 7.17% |
| Kanawha | | 180,745 | 152,735 | 84.50% | 13,416 | 7.42% | 357 | 0.20% | 2,138 | 1.18% | 47 | 0.03% | 733 | 0.41% | 8,599 | 4.76% | 2,720 | 1.50% |
| Lewis | | 17,033 | 16,088 | 94.45% | 66 | 0.39% | 19 | 0.11% | 58 | 0.34% | 7 | 0.04% | 23 | 0.14% | 581 | 3.41% | 191 | 1.12% |
| Lincoln | | 20,463 | 19,702 | 96.28% | 44 | 0.22% | 22 | 0.11% | 26 | 0.13% | 0 | 0.00% | 21 | 0.10% | 477 | 2.33% | 171 | 0.84% |
| Logan | | 32,567 | 30,785 | 94.53% | 580 | 1.78% | 41 | 0.13% | 63 | 0.19% | 1 | 0.00% | 34 | 0.10% | 839 | 2.58% | 224 | 0.69% |
| McDowell | | 19,111 | 15,871 | 83.05% | 2,139 | 11.19% | 20 | 0.10% | 20 | 0.10% | 4 | 0.02% | 45 | 0.24% | 622 | 3.25% | 390 | 2.04% |
| Marion | | 56,205 | 50,223 | 89.36% | 1,844 | 3.28% | 119 | 0.21% | 256 | 0.46% | 43 | 0.08% | 116 | 0.21% | 2,729 | 4.86% | 875 | 1.56% |
| Marshall | | 30,591 | 28,669 | 93.72% | 260 | 0.85% | 34 | 0.11% | 108 | 0.35% | 7 | 0.02% | 64 | 0.21% | 1,095 | 3.58% | 354 | 1.16% |
| Mason | | 25,453 | 24,322 | 95.56% | 193 | 0.76% | 32 | 0.13% | 74 | 0.29% | 5 | 0.02% | 20 | 0.08% | 637 | 2.50% | 170 | 0.67% |
| Mercer | | 59,664 | 52,264 | 87.60% | 3,694 | 6.19% | 159 | 0.27% | 292 | 0.49% | 6 | 0.01% | 139 | 0.23% | 2,405 | 4.03% | 705 | 1.18% |
| Mineral | | 26,938 | 24,603 | 91.33% | 711 | 2.64% | 36 | 0.13% | 113 | 0.42% | 5 | 0.02% | 50 | 0.19% | 1,111 | 4.12% | 309 | 1.15% |
| Mingo | | 23,568 | 22,293 | 94.59% | 405 | 1.72% | 33 | 0.14% | 32 | 0.14% | 0 | 0.00% | 33 | 0.14% | 608 | 2.58% | 164 | 0.70% |
| Monongalia | | 105,822 | 88,959 | 84.06% | 4,068 | 3.84% | 147 | 0.14% | 3,729 | 3.52% | 63 | 0.06% | 382 | 0.36% | 5,166 | 4.88% | 3,308 | 3.13% |
| Monroe | | 12,376 | 11,739 | 94.85% | 113 | 0.91% | 26 | 0.21% | 11 | 0.09% | 0 | 0.00% | 30 | 0.24% | 363 | 2.93% | 94 | 0.76% |
| Morgan | | 17,063 | 15,896 | 93.16% | 108 | 0.63% | 30 | 0.18% | 83 | 0.49% | 0 | 0.00% | 53 | 0.31% | 657 | 3.85% | 236 | 1.38% |
| Nicholas | | 24,604 | 23,525 | 95.61% | 56 | 0.23% | 44 | 0.18% | 72 | 0.29% | 7 | 0.03% | 15 | 0.06% | 712 | 2.89% | 173 | 0.70% |
| Ohio | | 42,425 | 37,559 | 88.53% | 1,656 | 3.90% | 67 | 0.16% | 387 | 0.91% | 20 | 0.05% | 134 | 0.32% | 1,955 | 4.61% | 647 | 1.53% |
| Pendleton | | 6,143 | 5,835 | 94.99% | 81 | 1.32% | 7 | 0.11% | 0 | 0.00% | 2 | 0.03% | 13 | 0.21% | 148 | 2.41% | 57 | 0.93% |
| Pleasants | | 7,653 | 7,215 | 94.28% | 95 | 1.24% | 22 | 0.29% | 17 | 0.22% | 0 | 0.00% | 10 | 0.13% | 231 | 3.02% | 63 | 0.82% |
| Pocahontas | | 7,869 | 7,455 | 94.74% | 51 | 0.65% | 23 | 0.29% | 9 | 0.11% | 0 | 0.00% | 25 | 0.32% | 199 | 2.53% | 107 | 1.36% |
| Preston | | 34,216 | 30,348 | 88.70% | 2,001 | 5.85% | 69 | 0.20% | 53 | 0.15% | 5 | 0.01% | 37 | 0.11% | 1,008 | 2.95% | 695 | 2.03% |
| Putnam | | 57,440 | 53,139 | 92.51% | 646 | 1.12% | 81 | 0.14% | 577 | 1.00% | 7 | 0.01% | 152 | 0.26% | 2,027 | 3.53% | 811 | 1.41% |
| Raleigh | | 74,591 | 63,510 | 85.14% | 5,790 | 7.76% | 132 | 0.18% | 819 | 1.10% | 16 | 0.02% | 156 | 0.21% | 2,971 | 3.98% | 1,197 | 1.60% |
| Randolph | | 27,932 | 26,033 | 93.20% | 424 | 1.52% | 56 | 0.20% | 96 | 0.34% | 1 | 0.00% | 85 | 0.30% | 925 | 3.31% | 312 | 1.12% |
| Ritchie | | 8,444 | 8,116 | 96.12% | 16 | 0.19% | 6 | 0.07% | 19 | 0.23% | 7 | 0.08% | 8 | 0.09% | 192 | 2.27% | 80 | 0.95% |
| Roane | | 14,028 | 13,231 | 94.32% | 35 | 0.25% | 28 | 0.20% | 38 | 0.27% | 0 | 0.00% | 9 | 0.06% | 535 | 3.81% | 152 | 1.08% |
| Summers | | 11,959 | 10,823 | 90.50% | 400 | 3.34% | 33 | 0.28% | 33 | 0.28% | 0 | 0.00% | 21 | 0.18% | 464 | 3.88% | 185 | 1.55% |
| Taylor | | 16,705 | 15,636 | 93.60% | 112 | 0.67% | 19 | 0.11% | 41 | 0.25% | 0 | 0.00% | 22 | 0.13% | 696 | 4.17% | 179 | 1.07% |
| Tucker | | 6,762 | 6,432 | 95.12% | 20 | 0.30% | 4 | 0.06% | 6 | 0.09% | 1 | 0.01% | 10 | 0.15% | 233 | 3.45% | 56 | 0.83% |
| Tyler | | 8,313 | 7,964 | 95.80% | 4 | 0.05% | 15 | 0.18% | 3 | 0.04% | 0 | 0.00% | 13 | 0.16% | 261 | 3.14% | 53 | 0.64% |
| Upshur | | 23,816 | 22,349 | 93.84% | 211 | 0.89% | 37 | 0.16% | 87 | 0.37% | 5 | 0.02% | 28 | 0.12% | 783 | 3.29% | 316 | 1.33% |
| Wayne | | 38,982 | 37,199 | 95.43% | 168 | 0.43% | 53 | 0.14% | 83 | 0.21% | 10 | 0.03% | 56 | 0.14% | 1,094 | 2.81% | 319 | 0.82% |
| Webster | | 8,378 | 8,086 | 96.51% | 10 | 0.12% | 14 | 0.17% | 4 | 0.05% | 2 | 0.02% | 7 | 0.08% | 205 | 2.45% | 50 | 0.60% |
| Wetzel | | 14,442 | 13,704 | 94.89% | 34 | 0.24% | 18 | 0.12% | 50 | 0.35% | 0 | 0.00% | 11 | 0.08% | 477 | 3.30% | 148 | 1.02% |
| Wirt | | 5,194 | 4,999 | 96.25% | 6 | 0.12% | 4 | 0.08% | 0 | 0.00% | 4 | 0.08% | 8 | 0.15% | 151 | 2.91% | 22 | 0.42% |
| Wood | | 84,296 | 77,718 | 92.20% | 1,016 | 1.21% | 148 | 0.18% | 564 | 0.67% | 17 | 0.02% | 209 | 0.25% | 3,450 | 4.09% | 1,174 | 1.39% |
| Wyoming | | 21,382 | 20,539 | 96.06% | 107 | 0.50% | 30 | 0.14% | 11 | 0.05% | 1 | 0.00% | 20 | 0.09% | 504 | 2.36% | 170 | 0.80% |

== See also ==
- List of governors of West Virginia
- List of National Historic Landmarks in West Virginia
- List of West Virginia counties by socioeconomic factors
