= List of U.S. states by socioeconomic factors =

This list of U.S. states by socioeconomic factors, unless otherwise footnoted, is taken from the "Quick Facts" web pages of the United States Census Bureau and the Population Health Institute of the University of Wisconsin. All data listed is for 2020 unless otherwise stated. Clicking on the triangles at the top of each column gives a rank ordering of states.

== Socioeconomic statistics for U.S. states ==
	Per capita income	Median household income	Population 2020	Population growth rate 2010–2020	Racial characteristics of population	% foreign born population	Life expectancy in years 2022	% of people in poverty	% of 25+ year old people with bachelor or higher degrees	% of people without health insurance	% vote for Biden in 2020 election
United States	$37,638	$69,201	331,449,520	7.4%	59.3% non-Hispanic white	13.6%	78.5	11.6%	33.7%	9.8%	51.3%
State
Alabama	$30,458	$54,943	5,024,206	5.1%	64.9% non-Hispanic white	3.5%	74.8	16.1%	26.7%	11.8%	36.6%
Alaska	$39,236	$80,287	739,391	4.1%	59.3% non-Hispanic white	7.9%	78.6	10.5%	30.6%	12.9%	42.8%
Arizona	$34,644	$65,913	7,151,202	18.8%	53.2% non-Hispanic white	13.0%	79.1	12.8%	31.2%	12.9%	49.4%
Arkansas	$29,210	$52,123	3,011,524	3.3%	71.3% non-Hispanic white	4.9%	75.5	16.3%	24.3%	11.0%	34.8%
California	$41,276	$84,097	39,538,223	6.1%	40.2% Hispanic	26.5%	81.0	12.3%	35.3%	8.1%	63.5%
Colorado	$42,807	$80,184	5,773,714	14.8%	67.0% non-Hispanic white	9.5%	80.0	9.7%	42.8%	9.3%	55.4%
Connecticut	$47,869	$83,572	3,605,944	0.9%	64.6% non-Hispanic white	14.8%	80.1	10.1%	40.6%	6.1%	59.3%
Delaware	$38,917	$72,724	989,948	10.2%	60.6% non-Hispanic white	9.6%	78.0	11.6%	33.6%	7.0%	58.7%
District of Columbia	$63,793	$99,547	689,545	14.6%	45.8% African American	13.5%	78.0	16.5%	61.4%	4.1%	92.2%
Florida	$35,216	$61,777	25,538,186	35.8%	52.7% non-Hispanic white	21.0%	79.7	13.1%	31.5%	15.1%	47.9%
Georgia	$34,516	$65,030	10,711,908	10.6%	51.0% non-Hispanic white	10.3%	77.3	14.0%	33.0%	14.7%	49.5%
Hawaii	$39,045	$88,005	1,455,271	7.0%	36.8% Asian	18.2%	82.3	11.2%	34.3%	4.8%	63.7%
Idaho	$31,509	$63,377	1,839,106	17.7%	81.1% non-Hispanic white	5.8%	79.2	11.0%	29.1%	10.5%	33.1%
Illinois	$39,571	$72,563	12,812,508	−0.1%	60.0% non-Hispanic white	14.1%	78.6	12.1%	36.2%	8.2%	57.5%
Indiana	$32,537	$61,944	6,785,528	4.7%	77.5% non-Hispanic white	5.4%	76.5	12.2%	27.8%	8.9%	41.0%
Iowa	$34,817	$65,429	3,190,369	4.7%	81.1% non-Hispanic white	5.5%	78.7	11.0%	29.1%	10.5%	44.9%
Kansas	$34,968	$64,521	2,937,880	3.0%	74.7% non-Hispanic white	7.0%	77.8	11.7%	34.4%	10.9%	41.4%
Kentucky	$30,634	$55,454	4,505,836	3.8%	83.5% non-Hispanic white	4.9%	75.1	16.5%	25.7%	6.7%	36.1%
Louisiana	$30,340	$53,571	4,657,757	2.7%	57.9% non-Hispanic white	4.2%	75.2	19.6%	25.5%	9.0%	39.9%
Maine	$36,171	$63,182	1,362,359	2.6%	92.5% non-Hispanic white	3.6%	78.6	11.5%	33.6%	7.3%	53.1%
Maryland	$45,915	$91,431	6,177,224	7.0%	49.0% non-Hispanic white	15.4%	78.6	10.3%	41.6%	7.1%	65.4%
Massachusetts	$48,617	$89,026	7,029,917	7.4%	70.1% non-Hispanic white	17.3%	80.2	10.4%	45.2%	2.9%	65.6%
Michigan	$34,678	$63,202	10,077,331	2.0%	74.2% non-Hispanic white	6.9%	77.5	13.1%	30.6%	6.0%	50.6%
Minnesota	$41,204	$77,706	5,706,494	7.6%	78.1% non-Hispanic white	8.5%	80.4	9.3%	37.6%	5.3%	52.4%
Mississippi	$26,807	$49,111	2,961,279	−0.2%	56.0% non-Hispanic white	2.3%	73.9	19.4%	23.2%	14.2%	41.0%
Missouri	$33,770	$61,043	6,154,913	2.8%	78.7% non-Hispanic white	4.2%	76.6	12.7%	30.7%	11.3%	41.3%
Montana	$34,423	$60,560	1,084,225	9.6%	85.5% non-Hispanic white	2.2%	78.4	11.9%	33.7%	10.1%	40.6%
Nebraska	$35,189	$66,644	1,961,504	7.4%	77.4% non-Hispanic white	7.4%	79.0	10.8%	32.9%	8.3%	39.2%
Nevada	$34,621	$65,686	3,014,614	16.3%	46.6% non-Hispanic white	19.2%	78.1	14.1%	26.1%	13.7%	50.1%
New Hampshire	$43,877	$83,449	1,377,529	4.6%	89.1% non-Hispanic white	6.0%	79.6	7.2%	38.2%	6.2%	52.7%
New Jersey	$46,691	$89,703	9,288,994	5.7%	53.5% non-Hispanic white	22.9%	79.5	10.2%	41.5%	8.4%	57.1%
New Mexico	$29,624	$54,020	2,117,522	2.8%	50.1% Hispanic	9.2%	76.9	18.4%	28.5%	12.0%	54.3%
New York	$43,208	$75,157	20,201,249	4.2%	54.7% non-Hispanic white	22.5%	80.3	13.9%	38.1%	6.1%	60.8%
North Carolina	$34,209	$60,516	10,439,388	9.5%	61.9% non-Hispanic white	8.2%	77.7	13.4%	33.0%	12.4%	48.6%
North Dakota	$37,343	$68,131	779,094	15.8%	83.2% non-Hispanic white	4.4%	78.8	11.1%	31.1%	9.2%	31.8%
Ohio	$34,326	$61,838	11,799,448	2.3%	77.7% non-Hispanic white	4.3%	76.5	13.4%	29.7%	7.8%	45.2%
Oklahoma	$30,976	$56,956	3,959,353	5.5%	63.8% non-Hispanic white	6.1%	75.5	15.5%	26.8%	16.3%	32.3%
Oregon	$37,816	$70,084	4,237,256	10.6%	74.1% non-Hispanic white	9.8%	79.7	12.2%	35.0%	7.3%	56.5%
Pennsylvania	$37,725	$67,857	13,002,700	2.4%	74.8% non-Hispanic white	7.1%	78.0	12.1%	33.1%	6.6%	49.9%
Rhode Island	$39,603	$74,489	1,097,379	4.3%	70.4% non-Hispanic white	14.2%	79.4	11.4%	35.3%	5.1%	59.4%
South Carolina	$32,823	$58,234	5,118,425	10.7%	63.4% non-Hispanic white	5.2%	76.4	14.6%	29.8%	12.2%	43.4%
South Dakota	$33,468	$63,920	886,667	8.9%	80.8% non-Hispanic white	3.8%	78.2	12.3%	30.0%	11.4%	35.6%
Tennessee	$32,908	$58,516	6,910,840	8.9%	73.1% non-Hispanic white	5.3%	75.3	13.6%	29.0%	11.9%	37.5%
Texas	$34,255	$67,321	29,145,505	15.9%	40.3% non-Hispanic white	17.0%	78.4	14.2%	31.5%	20.4%	46.4%
Utah	$33,378	$79,133	3,271,616	18.4%	77.2% non-Hispanic white	8.5%	79.7	8.6%	35.4%	10.1%	37.2%
Vermont	$37,903	$67,674	643,077	2.8%	92.2% non-Hispanic white	4.4%	79.7	10.3%	40.9%	4.5%	66.1%
Virginia	$43,267	$80,615	8,631,393	7.9%	60.3% non-Hispanic white	8.0%	79.1	12.5%	40.3%	8.0%	54.1%
Washington	$43,817	$82,400	7,705,281	14.6%	66.0% non-Hispanic white	14.7%	80.2	9.9%	37.3%	7.5%	58.0%
West Virginia	$28,761	$50,884	1,793,716	−3.2%	91.5% non-Hispanic white	1.6%	74.3	16.8%	21.8%	7.6%	29.7%
Wisconsin	$36,754	$67,080	5,893,718	3.6%	80.2% non-Hispanic white	5.0%	78.9	10.8%	31.5%	6.4%	49.5%
Wyoming	$36,288	$68,002	576,851	2.3%	83.3% non-Hispanic white	3.4%	78.1	11.4%	28.5%	14.8%	26.6%

Sources: , "Quick Facts", U.S. Census Bureau, accessed 12 April 2023. Search states, each of which has a page with the above data. , "County Health Rankings & Roadmaps," Population Health Institute, University of Wisconsin, accessed 12 April 2023. Life expectancy found under heading of "Additional Health Outcomes" for each state.

== See also ==
- List of Colorado counties by socioeconomic factors
- List of New Mexico counties by socioeconomic factors
- List of Oklahoma counties by socioeconomic factors
- List of West Virginia counties by socioeconomic factors
