= Census family =

In the Canadian census, families consisting of a married couple and children are referred to as Census Families. The US Census Bureau refers to such household structures as "Married couple families." This demographic features the highest median household income in the United States.

According to the 2021 definition by Statistics Canada, the term "census family":

Census family is defined as a married couple and the children, if any, of either and/or both spouses; a couple living common law and the children, if any, of either and/or both partners; or a parent of any marital status in a one-parent family with at least one child living in the same dwelling and that child or those children. All members of a particular census family live in the same dwelling. Children may be biological or adopted children regardless of their age or marital status as long as they live in the dwelling and do not have their own married spouse, common-law partner or child living in the dwelling. Grandchildren living with their grandparent(s) but with no parents present also constitute a census family.

This definition follows the standards outlined by the Principles and Recommendations for Population and Housing Censuses outlined by the United Nations Department of Economic and Social Affairs.

== See also ==
- Household income in the United States
- US Census Bureau
- Household
