= List of Oklahoma counties by socioeconomic factors =

The location of the State of Oklahoma in the United States of America.

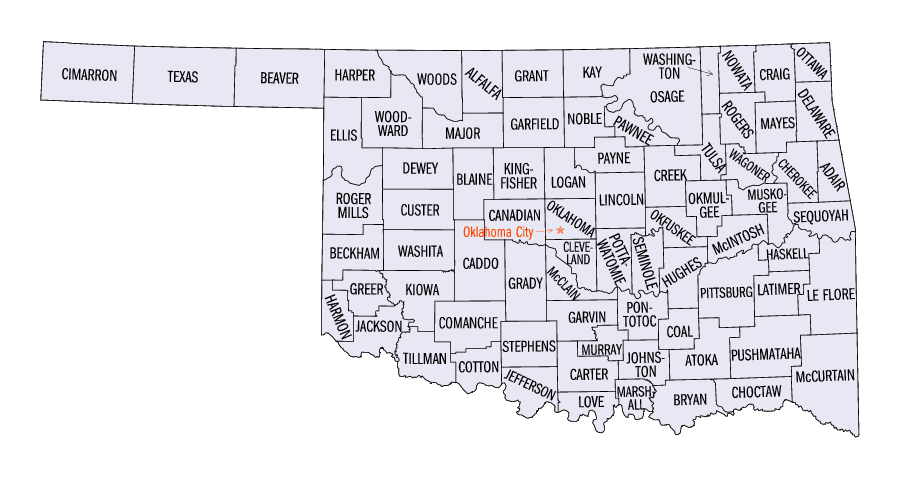
Oklahoma counties.

This list of Oklahoma counties by socioeconomic factors is taken from the "Quick Facts" web pages of the United States Census Bureau and the Population Health Institute of the University of Wisconsin. All data listed is for 2020 unless otherwise stated.

By comparison with the United States as a whole, the statistics in the following table shows that Oklahoma has a lower per capita and household income than the national average plus a lower rate of population growth and a less educated population as measured by the percentage of people with bachelor's or higher degrees compared to the national average. Oklahoma has a higher rate of people in poverty and people without health insurance than the U.S. as a whole. Oklahoma's population has a higher percentage of non-Hispanic whites than the national average, although one Oklahoma country has a plurality of Native Americans (American Indians) and another has a plurality of Hispanics.

Oklahomans on average have a life expectancy of three years less than the national average although three Oklahoma counties (out of 77) have life expectancies exceeding the national average. A few Oklahoma counties also exceed the U.S. national average for income, population growth rate, education, and have a lower rate of poverty. Republican candidate Donald Trump received a plurality of votes in every Oklahoma county, and a majority in every county but one in the 2020 Presidential election.

The 2020 census is a snapshot of Oklahoma's population. Depending upon the methodology used and the time of measurement, socioeconomic statistics cited may vary from year to year, especially in counties with very small populations.

== Socioeconomic statistics for Oklahoma counties (2020) ==
	Per capita income	Median household income	Population 2020	Population growth rate 2010-2020	Racial characteristics of population	% foreign born	Life expectancy in years	% of people in poverty	% of 25+ year old people with bachelor or higher degrees	% of people less than 65 years old without health insurance	% vote for Trump 2020
United States	$37,638	$69,201	331,449,520	7.4%	59.3% non-Hispanic white	13.6%	78.5	11.6%	33.7%	9.8%	46.8%
Oklahoma (State)	$30,976	$56,956	3,959,346	5.5%	63.8% non-Hispanic white	6.1%	75.5	15.6%	26.8%	16.3%	65.4%
COUNTY
Adair	$18,486	$37,490	19,495	−14.1%	46.6% Native American	1.9%	73.4	20.8%	10.6%	22.7%	78.6%
Alfalfa	$26,130	$66,552	5,699	0.1%	81.8% non-Hispanic white	3.1%	77.0	16.4%	21.0%	16.9%	87.4%
Atoka	$22,781	$45,148	14,143	−0.2%	69.0% non-Hispanic white	1.6%	75.3	17.1%	14.7%	23.2%	84.6%
Beaver	$26,434	$60,152	5,049	−10.4%	68.0% non-Hispanic white	11.2%	77.4	11.6%	21.5%	23.6%	90.4%
Beckham	$24,209	$50,365	22,410	1.3%	73.8% non-Hispanic white	4.2%	73.6	18.4%	14.7%	18.0%	85.1%
Blaine	$30,754	$52,538	8,735	−26.9%	69.8% non-Hispanic white	7.5%	71.7	18.0%	16.9%	16.9%	80.4%
Bryan	$26,639	$49,225	46,067	8.6%	68.8% non-Hispanic white	2.6%	74.9	16.5%	23.7%	21.6%	77.3%
Caddo	$22,844	$47,566	26,945	−9.0%	55.9% non-Hispanic white	5.3%	71.5	26.1%	14.8%	20.3%	71.1%
Canadian	$34,442	$76,973	154,405	33.6%	72.8% non-Hispanic white	5.2%	78.0	8.2%	31.4%	13.7%	70.3%
Carter	$27,964	$52,906	48,003	0.9%	67.7% non-Hispanic white	3.8%	74.3	14.2%	20.1%	20.7%	75.5%
Cherokee	$25,069	$47,421	47,078	0.2%	45.4% non-Hispanic white	2.9%	75.1	21.8%	27.0%	21.8%	63.4%
Choctaw	$23,705	$38,854	14,204	−6.6%	72.8% non-Hispanic white	1.7%	72.2	18.6%	14.2%	22.1%	80.6%
Cimarron	$32,029	$50,350	2,296	−7.2%	70.7% non-Hispanic white	4.7%	80.5	15.9%	29.0%	22.3%	92.0%
Cleveland	$34,223	$67,068	295,528	15.6%	69.5% non-Hispanic white	6.5%	78.4	12.3%	34.7%	14.9%	55.7%
Coal	$24,524	$43,697	5,266	−7.2%	64.4% non-Hispanic white	1.2%	71.4	18.7%	17.5%	23.0%	82.8%
Comanche	$28,512	$54,483	21,125	−2.4%	55.1% non-Hispanic white	5.7%	75.5	19.2%	23.9%	16.7%	58.7%
Cotton	$28,584	$54,787	5,527	−10.8%	73.9% non-Hispanic white	0.7%	73.4	17.6%	16.7%	18.6%	82.3%
Craig	$22,833	$45,094	14,107	−6.1%	60.9% non-Hispanic white	1.4%	74.4	17.5%	14.6%	17.5%	77.7%
Creek	$28,429	$56,384	71,754	2.6%	74.3% non-Hispanic white	2.0%	74.5	14.3%	17.1%	17.9%	76.4%
Custer	$29,440	$55,074	28,513	3.8%	66.2% non-Hispanic white	5.9%	74.1	17.0%	29.6%	22.0%	75.4%
Delaware	$30,620	$46,588	40,397	−2.6%	62.4% non-Hispanic white	1.9%	75.4	18.1%	18.2%	23.6%	78.6%
Dewey	$29,257	$53,672	4,484	−6.8%	79.1% non-Hispanic white	2.2%	73.4	16.4%	20.0%	19.1%	90.0%
Ellis	$28,534	$52,250	3,749	−9.7%	85.2% non-Hispanic white	2.9%	76.2	12.9%	18.4%	20.1%	90.1%
Garfield	$30,059	$60,732	62,846	3.7%	71.4% non-Hispanic white	7.4%	75.0	12.9%	23.4%	17.4%	75.7%
Garvin	$26,756	$50,441	26,656	−7.0%	70.7% non-Hispanic white	3.7%	72.3	15.6%	16.7%	21.2%	81.3%
Grady	$25,533	$47,721	26,236	5.3%	57.4% non-Hispanic white	1.8%	75.4	22.4%	15.3%	20.4%	80.2%
Grant	$31,725	$54,150	4,169	−7.9%	86.0% non-Hispanic white	0.2%	74.6	14.1%	23.7%	17.2%	86.1%
Greer	$22,289	$49,203	5,491	−12.0%	72.2% non-Hispanic white	0.4%	76.9	23.0%	10.6%	15.2%	81.3%
Harmon	$27,839	$55,369	2,488	−14.9%	53.1% non-Hispanic white	5.5%	71.5	27.8%	15.9%	22.5%	80.1%
Harper	$24,138	$51,481	3,272	−11.2%	70.9% non-Hispanic white	11.6%	78.0	11.4%	22.4%	25.0%	89.2%
Haskell	$23,870	$43,622	11,561	−9.5%	68.7% non-Hispanic white	2.0%	74.2	21.5%	15.8%	20.1%	83.1%
Hughes	$22,026	$42,425	13,367	−4.5%	61.1% non-Hispanic white	1.9%	71.9	21.4%	15.3%	18.9%	79.8%
Jackson	$28,091	$55,551	24,785	−6.3%	61.2% non-Hispanic white	5.4%	74.4	14.9%	24.5%	19.4%	77.8%
Jefferson	$25,687	$43,438	5,337	−17.5%	74.8% non-Hispanic white	3.3%	75.3	24.2%	15.2%	20.1%	84.9%
Johnston	$23,605	$46,754	10,272	−6.3%	66.9% non-Hispanic white	1.7%	73.0	20.9%	23.0%	18.0%	80.9%
Kay	$27,323	$50,391	43,700	−6.1%	71.9% non-Hispanic white	2.5%	73.1	15.8%	17.6%	18.1%	74.4%
Kingfisher	$32,779	$61,657	15,184	1.0%	74.2% non-Hispanic white	9.5%	77.0	10.7%	22.5%	21.5%	85.4%
Kiowa	$22,093	$36,985	8,509	−9.9%	72.3% non-Hispanic white	1.2%	71.8	20.6%	18.6%	16.2%	78.0%
Latimer	$26,072	$39,999	9,444	−15.3%	61.1% non-Hispanic white	1.3%	77.5	20.0%	12.9%	18.6%	80.9%
LeFlore	$22,167	$43,049	48,129	−5.3%	69.6% non-Hispanic white	3.4%	73.2	23.5%	15.3%	24.5%	80.9%
Lincoln	$27,915	$54,578	33,458	−2.4%	81.0% non-Hispanic white	1.1%	77.5	15.8%	15.0%	17.9%	80.7%
Logan	$37,404	$74,744	49,555	18.4%	76.3% non-Hispanic white	3.4%	79.1	13.1%	30.3%	17.2%	72.3%
Love	$24,995	$55,568	10,146	7.7%	68.5% non-Hispanic white	6.5%	74.3	15.3%	15.0%	20.6%	81.1%
Major	$28,666	$60,025	7,782	3.4%	83.1% non-Hispanic white	4.6%	74.9	10.7%	18.6%	21.3%	89.0%
Marshall	$25,915	$51,345	15,312	−3.3%	63.4% non-Hispanic white	7.6%	76.2	14.9%	15.8%	25.4%	80.7%
Mayes	$27,334	$52,956	39,046	−5.4%	62.9% non-Hispanic white	1.2%	74.1	14.6%	14.8%	21.2%	76.7%
McClain	$35,931	$73,914	41,662	20.7%	77.2% non-Hispanic white	3.3%	76.4	9.2%	26.1%	16.4%	79.5%
McCurtain	$21,908	$43,435	30,814	−7.0%	59.6% non-Hispanic white	3.6%	72.4	21.5%	14.6%	23.4%	82.7%
McIntosh	$23,606	$40,792	18,941	−6.5%	66.4% non-Hispanic white	1.2%	74.5	18.1%	12.7%	21.5%	74.0%
Murray	$28,434	$54,160	13,904	3.1%	69.2% non-Hispanic white	2.3%	74.8	13.5%	17.8%	20.9%	78.2%
Muskogee	$24,557	$44,166	66,339	−6.6%	54.1% non-Hispanic white	2.9%	72.1	19.2%	20.0%	19.3%	65.9%
Noble	$29,212	$62,910	10,924	−6.5%	79.6% non-Hispanic white	0.7%	74.8	11.8%	21.4%	15.7%	77.4%
Nowata	$26,531	$46,686	9,320	−11.5%	64.9% non-Hispanic white	1.5%	76.3	15.5%	16.0%	18.8%	82.2%
Okfuskee	$20,258	$43,000	11,310	−7.2%	59.4% non-Hispanic white	1.9%	69.2	26.8%	10.7%	20.1%	75.7%
Oklahoma	$34,129	$58,239	796,292	10.8%	54.5% non-Hispanic white	10.2%	75.5	16.3%	33.7%	17.5%	49.2%
Okmulgee	$25,501	$48,689	36,706	−8.4%	61.3% non-Hispanic white	1.0%	72.4	18.0%	15.1%	18.4%	67.5%
Osage	$27,562	$54,036	45,818	−3.5%	62.7% non-Hispanic white	0.9%	78.1	12.3%	19.0%	17.5%	68.8%
Ottawa	$22,544	$42,311	30,285	−4.9%	63.0% non-Hispanic white	2.7%	72.6	20.5%	15.4%	22.1%	74.7%
Pawnee	$26,189	$53,084	15,553	−6.2%	74.6% non-Hispanic white	1.2%	73.9	14.8%	17.4%	18.5%	77.6%
Payne	$24,985	$43,686	81,646	5.5%	76.1% non-Hispanic white	6.9%	77.5	20.7%	38.3%	19.2%	60.1%
Pittsburg	$26,504	$49,669	43,733	−4.5%	67.5% non-Hispanic white	2.0%	73.2	18.2%	18.7%	19.9%	77.3%
Pontotoc	$28,247	$55,862	38,065	1.5%	62.9% non-Hispanic white	2.0%	74.0	17.4%	29.3%	21.0%	70.5%
Pottawatomie	$26,460	$54,896	72,454	4.8%	70.7% non-Hispanic white	1.9%	74.0	14.4%	20.4%	17.9%	71.8%
Pushmataha	$22,839	$40,721	10,812	−6.6%	68.9% non-Hispanic white	0.7%	74.3	18.2%	15.1%	22.1%	84.7%
Roger Mills	$38,562	$55,385	3,442	−5.6%	82.4% non-Hispanic white	2.5%	76.6	15.0%	20.0%	17.7%	88.8%
Rogers	$33,830	$69,322	95,240	9.6%	70.1% non-Hispanic white	2.6%	77.5	9.7%	25.0%	14.0%	76.4%
Seminole	$21,153	$40,190	23,556	−7.6%	62.5% non-Hispanic white	2.2%	71.0	20.1%	14.2%	22.1%	72.1%
Sequoyah	$22,158	$43,496	39,281	−7.3%	60.5% non-Hispanic white	1.8%	73.8	19.6%	14.3%	22.4%	78.7%
Stevens	$28,327	$53,470	42,848	−4.9%	78.5% non-Hispanic white	2.6%	74.4	18.9%	18.1%	19.0%	81.6%
Texas	$22,112	$50,781	21,384	3.6%	48.1% Hispanic	25.6%	75.0	12.9%	26.0%	26.5%	81.6%
Tillman	$21,952	$41,138	6,968	−12.8%	56.8% non-Hispanic white	7.6%	74.8	20.9%	17.6%	20.8%	76.3%
Tulsa	$35,360	$60,382	669,279	10.9%	59.9% non-Hispanic white	8.9%	76.3	14.7%	32.7%	17.5%	56.5%
Wagoner	$32,647	$68,906	80,981	10.8%	69.4% non-Hispanic white	4.4%	78.8	9.7%	25.3%	17.3%	74.0%
Washington	$31,192	$55,216	52,455	2.9%	70.9% non-Hispanic white	4.1%	76.0	16.7%	29.3%	17.8%	72.7%
Washita	$29,259	$55,750	10,924	−6.1%	81.9% non-Hispanic white	1.9%	73.9	15.9%	19.2%	18.0%	85.5%
Woods	$28,575	$55,933	8,624	−2.9%	82.7% non-Hispanic white	1.4%	75.4	14.7%	32.3%	16.2%	81.4%
Woodward	$29,634	$55,700	20,470	1.9%	78.2% non-Hispanic white	5.2%	76.1	14.0%	19.6%	20.0%	84.9%

Sources: , "Quick Facts", U.S. Census Bureau, accessed April 12, 2023. Search counties, each of which has a page with the above data, by name and state. , "County Health Rankings & Roadmaps," Population Health Institute, University of Wisconsin, accessed April 12, 2023. Life expectancy found under heading of "Additional Health Outcomes" for each county.
