= List of West Virginia counties by socioeconomic factors =

This list of West Virginia counties by socioeconomic factors is taken from the "Quick Facts" web pages of the United States Census Bureau and the Population Health Institute of the University of Wisconsin. All data listed is for 2020 unless otherwise stated.

By comparison with other states, the statistics in the following table shows that West Virginia has a lower average on most socioeconomic factors than most U.S. states. West Virginia lost population from 2010 and 2020. The West Virginia population is less educated compared to the national average as measured by the lower percentage of people with bachelor's or higher degrees. West Virginia has a higher rate of people in poverty than the U.S. as a whole. West Virginia has less diversity in its population with a much higher percentage of non-Hispanic whites than the national average.

In 2019, West Virginia had the lowest life expectancy of any U.S. state. West Virginians have a life expectancy of four years less than the national average. However, two (out of 55) West Virginia counties have life expectancies exceeding the national average. A few West Virginia counties also exceed the U.S. national average for income, population growth rate, education, and have a lower rate of poverty. A majority of voters in every county of West Virginia voted for the Republican candidate for president in 2020. The percentage of people with health insurance in West Virginia exceeds the national average.

The 2020 census is a snapshot of West Virginia's population. Depending upon the methodology used and the time of measurement, socioeconomic statistics cited may vary from year to year, especially in counties with small populations where, for example, the gain or loss of a major employer may result in a sizeable change in measurements of poverty, population growth, income, and others.

== Socioeconomic statistics for West Virginia counties ==
	Per capita income	Median household income	Population 2020	Population growth rate 2010–2020	Racial characteristics of population	Life expectancy in years 2022	% of people in poverty	% of 25+ year old people with bachelor or higher degrees	% of people without health insurance	% vote for Biden in 2020 election
United States	$37,638	$69,201	331,449,520	7.4%	59.3% non-Hispanic white	78.5	11.6%	33.7%	9.8%	51.3%
West Virginia	$28,761	$50,884	1,793,716	−3.2%	91.5% non-Hispanic White	74.3	16.8%	21.8%	7.6%	29.7%
COUNTY
Barbour	$23,616	$42,260	15,465	−6.8%	94.9% non-Hispanic white	75.0	19.7%	13.0%	9.2%	21.8%
Berkeley	$32,695	$68,101	122,076	17.2%	82.2% non-Hispanic white	74.9	9.9%	23.4%	7.8%	33.3%
Boone	$23,630	$50,598	21,809	−11.4%	97.3% non-Hispanic white	71.1	24.7%	11.3%	8.3%	22.6%
Braxton	$21,361	$42,519	12,447	−14.3%	96.0% non-Hispanic white	76.3	21.3%	13.8%	9.6%	25.7%
Brooke	$28,203	$51,210	22,559	−6.3%	95.1% non-Hispanic white	75.8	13.0%	20.5%	7.4%	27.7%
Cabell	$27,985	$43,779	94,350	−2.0%	89.8% non-Hispanic white	71.3	19.0%	28.3%	8.1%	40.1%
Calhoun	$23,658	$37,428	6,229	−18.3%	96.6% non-Hispanic white	76.5	23.8%	10.2%	8.5%	19.1%
Clay	$19,149	$37,197	8,051	−14.2%	96.7% non-Hispanic white	72.4	22.3%	12.0%	9.0%	19.0%
Doddridge	$28,751	$58,750	7,808	−4.8%	94.2% non-Hispanic white	79.8	18.1%	13.1%	9.2%	14.0%
Fayette	$22,677	$45,988	40,488	−12.1%	92.1% non-Hispanic white	72.7	19.9%	16.4%	8.8%	30.0%
Gilmer	$18,855	$45,870	7,408	−14.8%	80.7% non-Hispanic white	76.8	25.3%	20.2%	9.4%	22.5%
Grant	$25,221	$47,224	10,976	−8.1%	95.9% non-Hispanic white	76.6	15.2%	11.4%	9.8%	11.0%
Greenbrier	$27,462	$41,694	32,977	−7.1%	92.4% non-Hispanic white	74.4	18.9%	19.0%	9.6%	29.4%
Hampshire	$25,324	$50,980	23,093	−3.6%	95.3% non-Hispanic white	75.2	15.9%	12.6%	10.2%	19.2%
Hancock	$31,066	$52,062	29,095	−5.2%	93.3% non-Hispanic white	74.4	14.9%	17.8%	9.1%	27.5%
Hardy	$28,388	$46,592	14,299	2.0%	90.0% non-Hispanic white	75.5	17.5%	13.2%	11.9%	21.8%
Harrison	$30,029	$54,124	65,921	−4.6%	93.7% non-Hispanic white	75.2	14.6%	23.3%	8.9%	30.2%
Jackson	$28,937	$53,165	27,971	−4.2%	96.5% non-Hispanic white	76.1	15.4%	17.3%	7.4%	23.7%
Jefferson	$38,946	$86,711	52,701	7.9%	82.2% non-Hispanic white	77.4	9.7%	31.1%	7.1%	43.8%
Kanawha	$31,894	$50,574	180,745	−6.4%	87.5% non-Hispanic white	72.5	15.9%	27.4%	7.9%	41.8%
Lewis	$26,271	$45,345	17,033	4.0%	96.0% non-Hispanic white	73.0	17.9%	16.0%	8.9%	20.6%
Lincoln	$23,084	$46,683	20,463	−5.8%	97.2% non-Hispanic white	70.8	20.3%	7.8%	7.9%	21.8%
Logan	$22,858	$38,493	32,567	−11.4%	95.9% non-Hispanic white	68.5	23.5%	11.2%	9.4%	17.9%
Marion	$29,526	$55,094	26,205	−0.4%	92.6% non-Hispanic white	76.5	15.1%	24.0	9.1	34.5%
Marshall	$30,706	$52,706	30,591	−7.6%	96.2% non-Hispanic white	75.7	16.4%	19.4%	7.6%	24.5%
Mason	$28,598	$49,957	25,453	−6.8%	96.1% non-Hispanic white	73.6	18.6%	14.7%	6.7%	22.5%
McDowell	$15,474	$39,127	19,111	−13.6%	88.7% non-Hispanic white	67.7	31.7%	6.4%	9.7%	20.4%
Mercer	$25,061	$43,393	59,664	−9.0%	89.9% non-Hispanic white	71.8	18.1%	20.7%	8.3%	22.1%
Mineral	$30,564	$57,345	26,938	−5.1%	93.3% non-Hispanic white	75.5	13.5%	20.7%	7.3%	20.7%
Mingo	$19,631	$35,349	23,568	−12.2%	95.7% non-Hispanic white	70.1	31.1%	9.0%	10.1%	13.9%
Monongalia	$36,502	$56,466	105,822	10.0%	87.9% non-Hispanic white	79.3	18.3%	46.4%	9.2%	48.2%
Monroe	$23,787	$47,417	12,376	−8.3%	95.6% non-Hispanic white	76.5	15.3%	14.9%	10.4%	20.7%
Morgan	$31,402	$56,616	17,063	−2.7%	94.3% non-Hispanic white	75.5	12.8%	19.5%	9.9%	23.0%
Nicholas	$22,898	$42,946	24,064	−8.3%	96.6% non-Hispanic white	74.8	19.8%	15.9%	8.5%	20.9%
Ohio	$32,336	$57,516	42,425	−4.5%	91.8% non-Hispanic white	74.7	14.7%	33.3%	7.7%	36.3%
Pendleton	$25,108	$46,506	6,143	−20.2%	94.5% non-Hispanic white	76.7	16.0%	16.5%	10.5%	22.4%
Pleasants	$35,800	$58,433	7,653	−0.6%	95.4% non-Hispanic white	76.7	14.3%	11.9%	6.4%	20.0%
Pocahontas	$21,639	$37,225	7,869	−9.7%	94.4% non-Hispanic white	75.3	16.2%	13.9%	9.9%	26.1%
Preston	$26,504	$55,755	34,216	2.1%	95.9% non-Hispanic white	76.4	14.3%	16.8%	8.8%	21.7%
Putnam	$34,832	$68,740	57,440	3.5%	94.9% non-Hispanic white	76.2	10.1%	26.7%	6.5%	27.6%
Raleigh	$25,549	$43,150	74,591	−5.1%	87.3% non-Hispanic white	71.5	22.0%	19.8%	7.5%	24.1%
Randolph	$24,888	$47,343	26,932	−5.0%	95.2% non-Hispanic white	76.4	17.6%	17.3%	9.0%	27.6%
Ritchie	$25,094	$45,184	8,444	−19.2%	96.7% non-Hispanic white	76.2	19.2%	9.6%	9.9%	13.7%
Roane	$23,291	$38,608	14,028	−6.0%	96.3% non-Hispanic white	72.8	18.2%	13.4%	9.0%	25.2%
Summers	$23,195	$41,077	11,959	−14.1%	91.7% non-Hispanic white	74.1	24.8%	17.2%	8.8%	25.9%
Taylor	$27,899	$52,823	16,705	−1.1%	95.9% non-Hispanic white	76.0	16.0%	16.0%	9.1%	24.3%
Tucker	$27,914	$49,808	6,762	−5.3%	97.1% non-Hispanic white	75.5	14.7%	20.6%	11.3%	24.4%
Tyler	$27,047	$50,601	8,313	−9.7%	96.7% non-Hispanic white	77.1	14.0%	15.3%	7.3%	16.1%
Upshur	$26,995	$44,470	23,816	−1.8%	95.5% non-Hispanic white	77.8	18.6%	16.3%	9.6%	22.1%
Wayne	$25,683	$45,951	38,982	−8.4%	96.8% non-Hispanic white	73.3	16.2%	17.2%	8.2%	24.1%
Webster	$19,672	$37,720	8,378	−2.5%	97.1% non-Hispanic white	74.3	25.2%	12.5%	8.1%	17.9%
Wetzel	$24,688	$47,611	14,442	−12.9%	96.8% non-Hispanic white	75.2	16.4%	14.5%	8.0%	23.1%
Wirt	$25,483	$49,441	5,194	−9.1%	96.4% non-Hispanic white	76.5	17.7%	14.1%	8.4%	17.6%
Wood	$29,176	$50,231	84,296	−3.1%	94.9% non-Hispanic white	74.7	14.7%	21.8%	9.0%	28.2%
Wyoming	$22,237	$44,630	21,382	−10.1%	97.0% non-Hispanic white	71.3	25.0%	11.6%	9.1%	13.5%

Sources: , "Quick Facts", U.S. Census Bureau, accessed 12 April 2023. Search counties, each of which has a page with the above data, by name and state. , "County Health Rankings & Roadmaps," Population Health Institute, University of Wisconsin, accessed 12 April 2023. Life expectancy found under heading of "Additional Health Outcomes" for each county.
