= Knowledge (disambiguation) =

Knowledge is a detailed familiarity with, or understanding of, a person, thing, or situation.

Knowledge, Know, Known, etc. may also refer to:

== Arts, entertainment, and media ==
=== Music ===
==== Works ====
- Know (album), a 2018 album by Jason Mraz
- "Knowledge" (song), by ska punk band Operation Ivy
- The Knowledge (album), by British rock group Squeeze
- "Know", a song by Mary J. Blige
- "Known" (song), a 2017 song by Tauren Wells

==== Artists ====
- Knowledge (band), a Jamaican reggae group
- Knxwledge, an American music producer
- Knowledge, a ska punk band fronted by Nick Traina

=== Periodicals ===
- Knowledge (magazine), a British science magazine from 1881 to 1918
- Knowledge (partwork), a British weekly educational magazine from 1961 to 1966
- BBC Knowledge (magazine), a British magazine founded in 2008

=== Television channels ===
- BBC Knowledge, a defunct British television channel
- Knowledge Channel, an educational television channel in the Philippines
- Knowledge Network, an educational television channel in British Columbia
- Knowledge TV, a defunct American cable network

=== Books ===
- Knowledge (partwork), a British magazine for children which was assembled in binders into an encyclopedia
- The Knowledge: How to Rebuild Our World from Scratch, a non-fiction book by Lewis Dartnell

=== Other arts ===
- The Knowledge (film), a 1979 film
- The Knowledge (mural), a 2010 mural

== Other uses ==
- The Knowledge, the in-depth study of street routes and places of interest that London taxicab drivers must complete to obtain a licence
  - Hellblazer Presents: Chas – The Knowledge, a 2008 comic book about a London taxicab driver
- Knowledge (legal construct), a concept in English law
- Known (software), an open source publishing tool
- Epistemology, in philosophy, the theory of knowledge
- Patchouli Knowledge, a fictional character from Embodiment of Scarlet Devil in the video game series Touhou Project
- Academic disciplines, which are subdivisions of knowledge that are taught and researched as part of higher education

== See also ==
- Common knowledge (disambiguation)
- The Know (disambiguation)
- Dr. Know (disambiguation)
- Do You Know (disambiguation)
- I Know (disambiguation)
- KNOW-FM, a Minnesota Public Radio station
- Knower (disambiguation)
- Who Knows (disambiguation)
