= Ordinary People (disambiguation) =

Ordinary People is a 1980 film directed by Robert Redford.

Ordinary People may also refer to:

== Book and stage ==
- Ordinary People (Guest novel), a 1976 novel by Judith Guest on which the film is based
- Ordinary People (play), a stage version of the novel by Judith Guest
- Ordinary People (Evans novel), a 2018 novel by Diana Evans
- Ordinary People: Our Story, an autobiography by Ozzy Osbourne

== Film and television ==
- Ordinary People (2009 film), directed by Vladimir Perišić
- "Ordinary People" (Lois & Clark), an episode of Lois & Clark: The New Adventures of Superman
- "Ordinary People" (The Vampire Diaries), an episode The Vampire Diaries

== Music ==
- "Ordinary People" (Clay Walker song), 1998
- "Ordinary People" (John Legend song), 2004
- "Ordinary People" (Steve Harley song), 2015
- "Ordinary People" (The Box song), 1987
- "Ordinary People", a 1975 song by The Kinks from Soap Opera
- "Ordinary People", a 2007 song by Neil Young from Chrome Dreams II
- "Ordinary People", a 2018 song by Bugzy Malone featuring JP Cooper from B. Inspired

== Other uses ==
- Ordinary People (Slovakia), a political party in Slovakia
- Aam Aadmi, term in India for the ordinary people
  - Aam Aadmi Party (lit. 'Ordinary People Party'), a political party in India

== See also ==
- Ordinary Man (disambiguation)
- Common man (disambiguation)
- Ordinary Person, a 2017 South Korean film
