= Gatefold =

Type of packaging for music albums

Gatefold issue of rock band Queen's Made in Heaven CD

A gatefold cover or gatefold LP is a form of packaging for LP records that became popular in the mid-1960s. A gatefold cover, when folded, is the same size as a standard LP cover (i.e., a 12½-inch [32.7-centimetre] square). The larger gatefold cover provided a means of including artwork, liner notes, and/or song lyrics that would otherwise not fit on a standard record cover. It became famous as an extension of progressive rock, as the expansive, transient gatefolds by artists such as Roger Dean, H. R. Giger, or Hipgnosis became associated with concept albums.

Gatefold sleeves were also frequently used when an album contained more than one record, with Bob Dylan's 1966 double album, Blonde on Blonde being an early example of a multi-LP album to be released in a gatefold. Typically, double albums would feature one disc on each half of the cover, with larger albums either placing multiple LPs in one sleeve or using larger gatefolds. While some multi-LP releases (particularly those issued during the vinyl record's market dormancy from 1988 to 2007) would either package the discs in a simple sleeve or sandwich the records between two cards and shrink wrap, the prominence of gatefold for multi-LP albums led it to become the most common form of packaging for them.

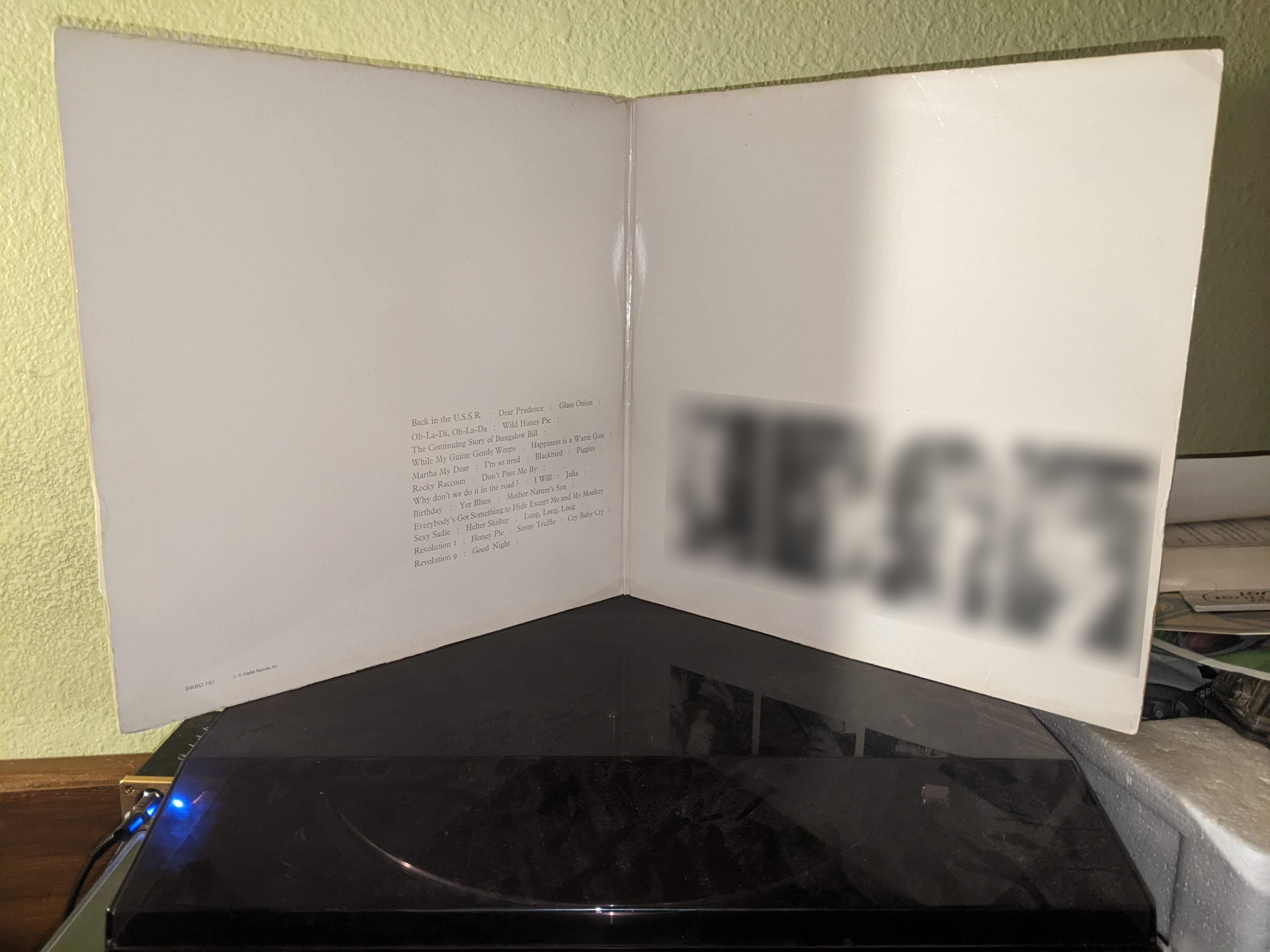
An example of an LP gatefold from a vinyl copy of the Beatles' 1968 self-titled release. (The four portraits of the band members on the right have been blurred out for copyright reasons.)

Starting in the early 1950s, RCA used gatefold packaging for some of their deluxe 45 RPM single releases, such as Nat King Cole's eight-song "Unforgettable" EP, with two 45s, released in 1952. Gatefold packaging for LPs was popularized in the late 1950s by band leader and stereophonic studio recording pioneer Enoch Light so he could fit liner notes he had written describing the sounds in each song on the album sleeve. Disagreement exists as to the identity of the first gatefold LP packaging used with a traditional 33⅓ LP.

The LP gatefold has also been adapted to package CDs without a jewel case.

== Original use of the term ==
The left and right panel of a gate-folded sheet open like a double gate.

In the printing industry, the term gate fold or gatefold refers to a document folding method that uses two parallel folds to create six panels; the left and right panels are half the width of the center panels and fold inward to meet in the middle without overlapping. The fold configuration is commonly used for materials such as brochures and presentation folders.

== See also ==
- Album cover
- Record sleeve
