= Ordinary Man =

Ordinary Man may refer to:

- Ordinary Man (Christy Moore album) (1985)
- Ordinary Man (Kiosk album) (2005)
- Ordinary Man (Ozzy Osbourne album) (2020)
  - "Ordinary Man" (Ozzy Osbourne song), the album's title track

== See also ==
- An Ordinary Man (disambiguation)
- Ordinary People (disambiguation)
- Common man (disambiguation)
- Ordinary Person, a 2017 South Korean film
- "Ordinary Person", a song from the 2023 Indian film Leo
- Extra Ordinary Man, a 2023 Indian film
- Aam Aadmi, term in India for the ordinary man
  - Aam Aadmi Party or Ordinary Man Party, a political party in India
