= The Common =

The Common may refer to:

== Places ==
- The Common, Brinkworth, hamlet in Wiltshire, England
- The Common, Broughton Gifford, hamlet in Wiltshire, England
- The Common, Queensland, suburb of Rockhampton, Australia
- The Common, Suffolk, England, in Little Blakenham parish
- The Common, Winterslow, hamlet in Wiltshire, England
- The Common, St Neots, England, where St Neots Rugby Football Club play
- The Common, a nickname of such places as:
  - Boston Common
  - Cambridge Common
  - The Commonwealth of Massachusetts

== Periodicals ==
- The Common (magazine), Amherst, Massachusetts

== See also ==
- Common (disambiguation)
- Common law (disambiguation)
- Commons (disambiguation)
- Commonwealth (disambiguation)
- Comyn (disambiguation)
