= Rack card =

Commercial advertising document

A rack card is a small printed advertising or informational piece designed to be displayed in literature racks or countertop holders at locations with high foot traffic. Rack cards differ from multi-panel brochures in that they are single sheets intended for quick browsing and takeaway, typically emphasizing a small number of key messages such as location, hours, and a call to action.

== Format and specifications ==
Rack cards are typically about 4 × 9 inches and are usually double-sided. They are single sheets printed on the front and back with no folds. Some rack cards are die-cut to create custom shapes or rounded corners, provided the final dimensions fit standard literature holders.

In regions that follow ISO 216 paper formats, rack-style leaflets are often produced near DL (DIN long) dimensions (approximately 99 × 210 mm).

== Uses and distribution ==
Rack cards are used to promote attractions, services, and events in settings where visitors browse printed materials. In tourism, brochures and rack cards remain common communication tools and can influence visitor behavior at the point of decision. Trade guidance highlights their placement in venues such as hotels, travel centers, rest areas, convenience stores, waiting rooms and reception areas. They are also used in healthcare for patient education, where nonprofits and clinics provide rack cards in countertop holders for easy access.

Beyond display racks, rack cards are also distributed through other channels: they may be included in direct mail campaigns or mailed as postcards when designed to postal specifications, inserted into presentation folders for outreach, and placed in event registration or welcome packets. Some public agencies also mail rack cards directly to households as part of program outreach.

== Design and messaging ==
Marketing guidance suggests using the front of the card to capture attention and the back to supply essential details and a call to action. Trade and nonprofit guidance often recommends printing rack cards in full color on heavy cardstock for durability; many designs use concise text, high-contrast graphic design, and scannable elements such as QR codes to direct readers to additional information. Campaign handbooks describe rack cards as suitable for branding, photos, key issues, election information, and contact details, with printing on both sides and potential use as a postcard mailer when designed to postal specifications.

== See also ==
- Marketing communications
- Point of sale
- Brochure
- Flyer (pamphlet)
- Print design
