= Commoner (disambiguation) =

A commoner is a person who is not a member of the nobility or priesthood.

Commoner may also refer to:

== Status or membership ==
- Commoner (academia), a university student not receiving a scholarship or exhibition
- Commoner, a person who is not a member of the British nobility
- Commoner, a person who shares rights over common land
- Commoner, a member of the Court of Common Council of the City of London Corporation
- Commoner, one of the estates of the realm
- Commoner, a member of the House of Commons of the United Kingdom

== Other uses ==
- Barry Commoner (1917–2012), American biologist and politician
- Commoner (Dungeons & Dragons), one of the base non-player character categories
- The Commoner, a newspaper published in Nebraska, US from 1901 to 1923

== See also ==
- Common (disambiguation)
- Commons (disambiguation)
- Common man (disambiguation)
- Everyman (disambiguation)
- Morganatic marriage
- The Great Commoner (disambiguation), a nickname applied to various people
- The Masses (disambiguation)
