= Company Folders =

Company Folders, Inc.
- Company type: Private
- Founded: 2003; 22 years ago
- Founder: Vladimir Gendelman
- Headquarters: Pontiac, Michigan, United States
- Area served: United States
- Key people: Vladimir Gendelman (CEO)
- Products: Document folders, Ring binders, report covers, and business cards
- Website: companyfolders.com

Company Folders, Inc. is an American online retailer based in Pontiac, Michigan. It specializes in selling customized document folders, report covers, and business cards.

Vladimir Gendelman founded the company in 2003 and now serves as its CEO.

== History ==
Company Folders was founded in 2003 by a Ukrainian-born immigrant, Vladimir Gendelman. He founded it based on an observation of a limited availability of customizable presentation folders online. Prior to starting Company Folders, Gendelman owned a computer repair shop. Facing challenges in securing traditional bank financing, Gendelman initially financed the venture using credit cards. By 2004, the company achieved self-sustainability, allowing Gendelman to settle his credit card debts.

In June 2008, Company Folders relocated its headquarters from Waterford, Michigan to Keego Harbor, Michigan. Later, it was relocated to Pontiac, Michigan in 2017.

In May 2013, Company Folders launched Folder Design Gallery.

In 2022, following the Russian invasion of Ukraine, Company Folders suspended its operations in Ukraine. In the same year, the company removed the college degree requirement to apply to its jobs.
