= Print design =

Type of graphic design

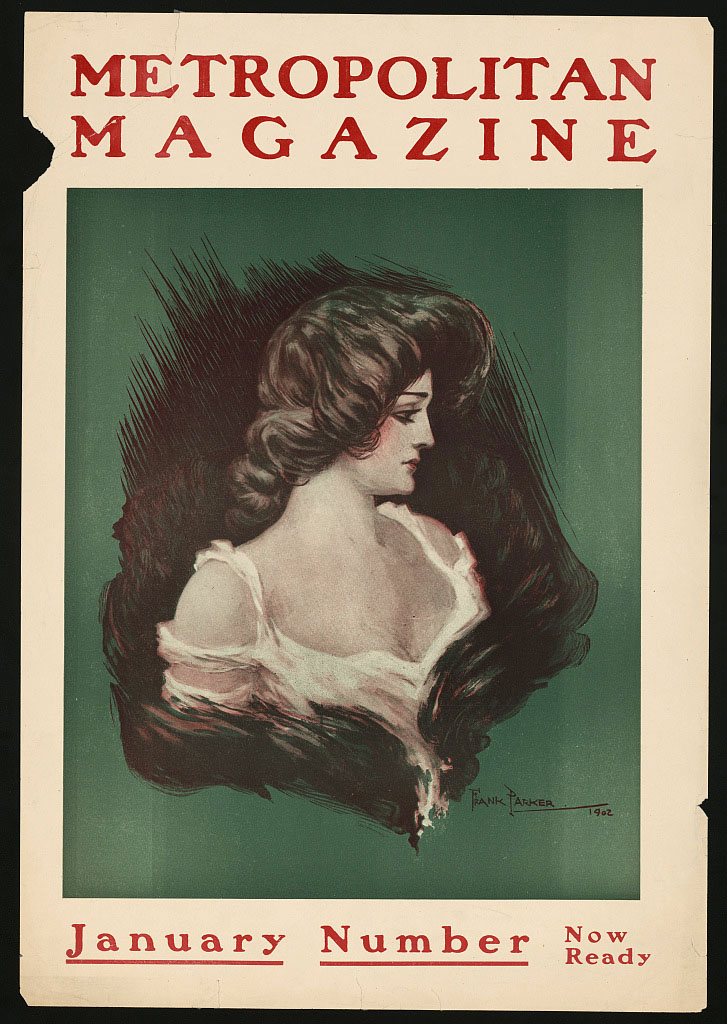
Ad Poster

Print design, a subset of graphic design, is a form of visual communication used to convey information to an audience through intentional aesthetic design printed on a tangible surface, designed to be printed on paper, as opposed to presented on a digital platform. A design can be considered print design if its final form was created through an imprint made by the impact of a stamp, seal, or dye on the surface of the paper.

== History ==
There are several methods used to create print design artworks, spanning more than five hundred years. Printing technologies available throughout history heavily influenced the style of designs created by graphic designers at the time of production, as different methods of creating print design offer varying features. Before the emergence of the design and printing technologies of the twentieth and twenty-first century such as the inkjet printer, Adobe Illustrator, Adobe Photoshop, and Adobe InDesign, print design relied on mechanical technologies such as movable type, the letterpress, and lithography.

=== Movable type ===
Chinese alchemist Pi Sheng invented the concept of movable type, circa 1045 CE. He created individual characters out of clay and lined them up, using a wax-like substance to keep them in place. They could then be pressed down to create an imprint, mimicking the effect of woodblock printing, which was the popular method at the time. Reusable, movable type was a revolutionary concept, however it did not gain traction in China because organizing the characters was not very compatible with the Chinese writing system. This innovation came about more than 400 years prior to the "invention" of movable type with the printing press in Europe, and it is unlikely that Pi Sheng was of any influence to Gutenberg.

=== Letterpress ===
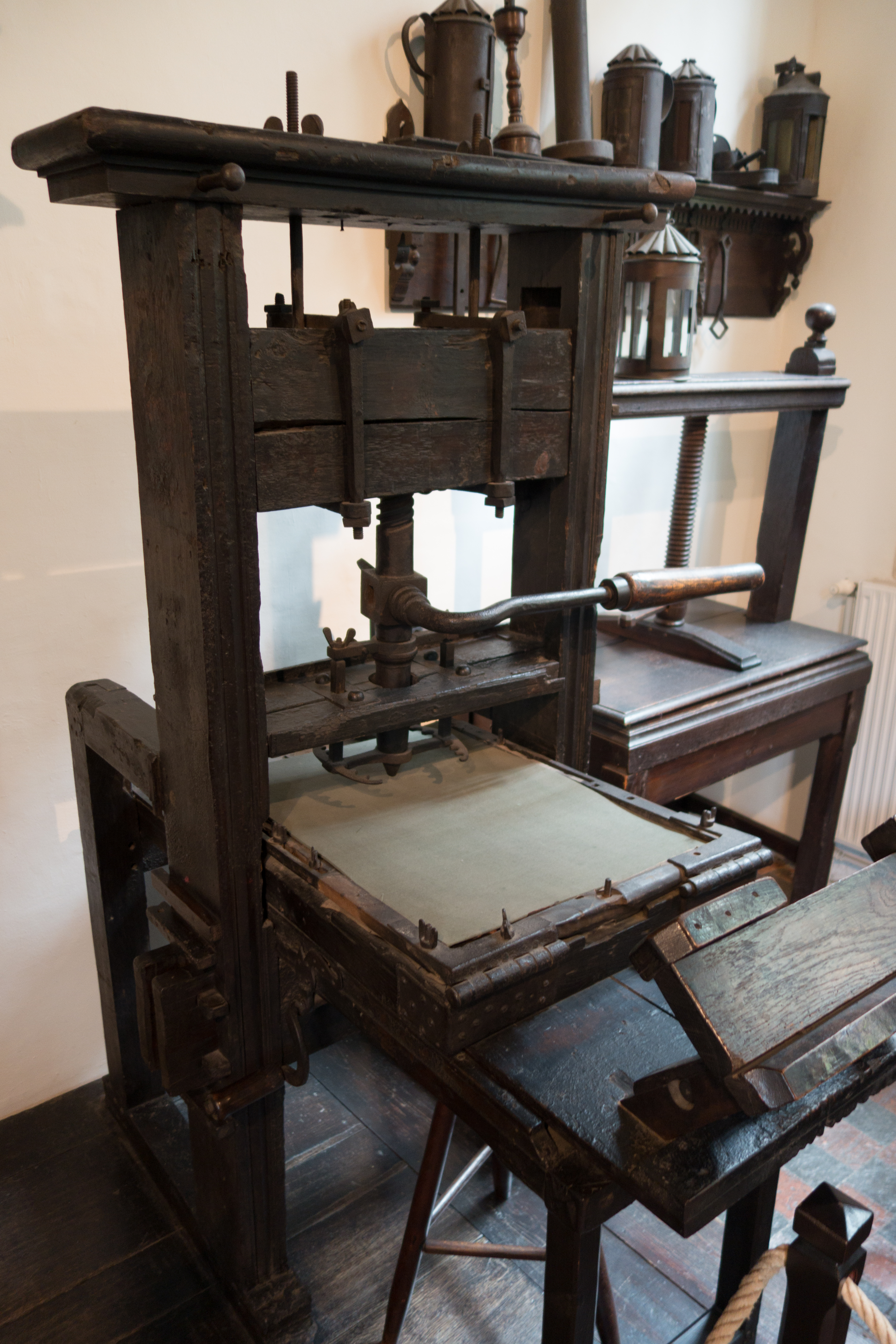
Letterpress from the earliest days of printing

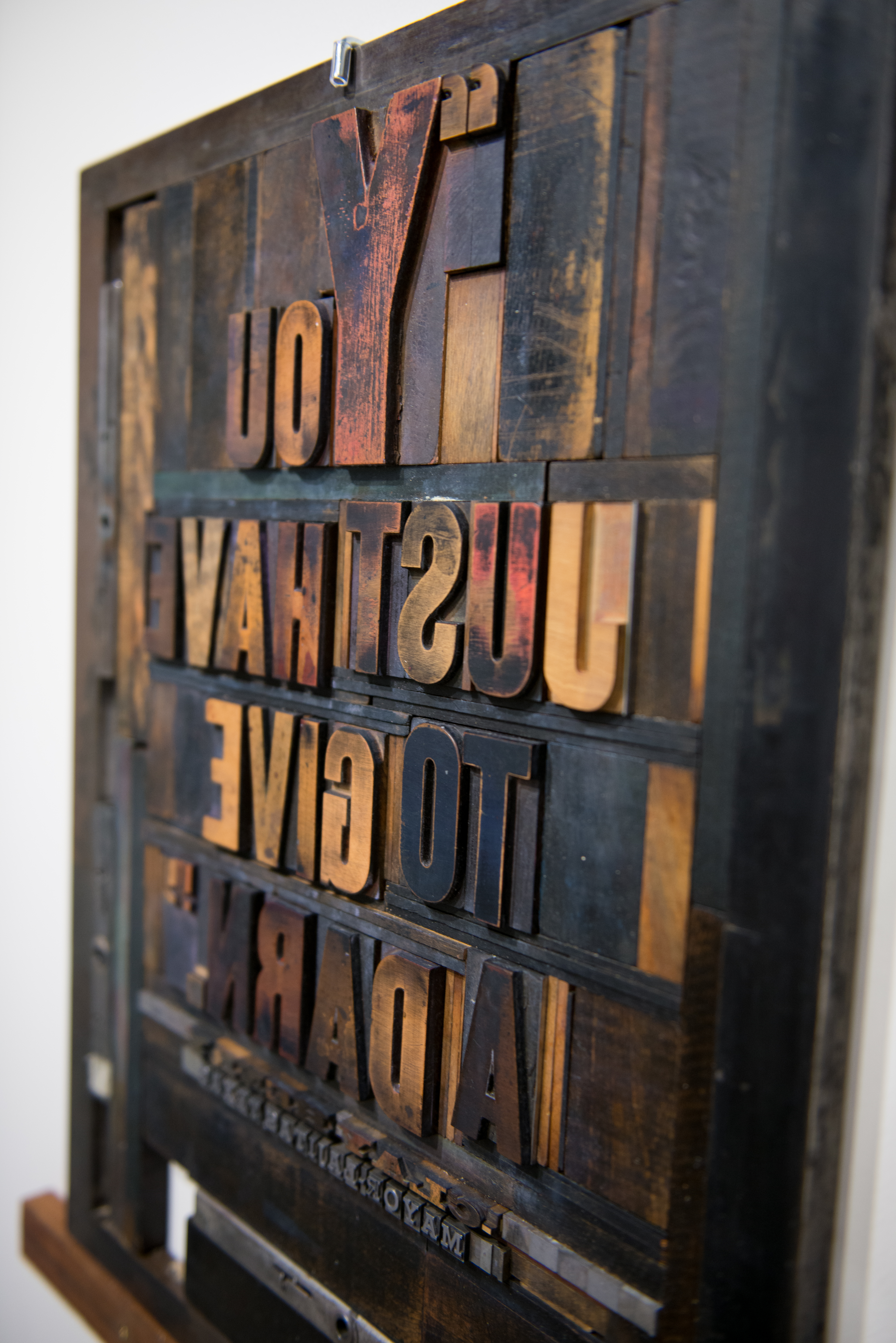
Metal and wood type blocks arranged for printing by letterpress

The letterpress, perfected in the mid fifteenth century by Johannes Gutenberg (1398-1468) through the combined use of the printing press, oil-based inks, and cast metal type, remained the most common and efficient method of printing until the 1960s. Used frequently with typography design and type layout, the letterpress operates through the stamping of type and photo-engraved metal blocks on paper. The metal blocks are arranged in a frame by the printer, and the text columns and etchings are separated by vertical or horizontal metal bars; it is even possible to arrange the blocks at an angle using a letterpress. With the letterpress, print design and graphics remained black and white print on paper until the late nineteenth century. The letterpress was the first technology that allowed for mass production and distribution of printed material at a large scale, and because of this, quickly replaced the slow processes of woodblock printing and hand copying of print design. As time went on and technology progressed, the letterpress did as well. The Industrial Revolution brought about steam powered printing presses and Linotype machines, advancing the mechanical process of printing to a speed never seen before.

=== Lithography ===
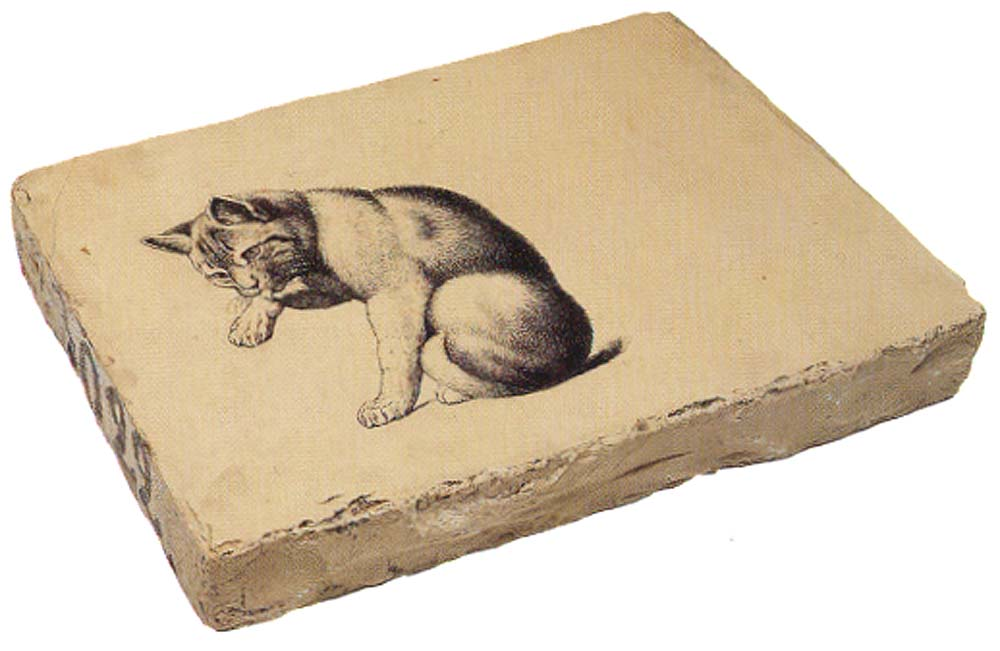
Lithographic stone artwork

Lithography, introduced at the end of the nineteenth century, allowed for the use of color in prints and allowed artists to print on larger surfaces than the letterpress. Additionally, lithography enabled artists to draw their own lettering on designs, which was not possible with the letterpress. The design was drawn directly onto the stone by the artist, and then transferred onto the surface of the paper.

== Production standards and file delivery ==
Professional print workflows often use press-ready PDF files that conform to the PDF/X family of ISO standards (ISO 15930), which define constrained PDF subsets for prepress data exchange intended for predictable print reproduction. PDF/X files include requirements such as declaring an output intent that identifies the intended printing conditions, supporting consistent color reproduction across devices and presses.

== Uses ==
Print design is essential for branding, marketing, and communication, encompassing business cards, brochures, posters, flyers, packaging, publishing, and advertising. It involves creating visual elements and strategic messaging to effectively communicate with target audiences. Beyond the graphic composition, print projects often specify physical substrates and post-press finishing that shape the tactile and visual qualities of the piece, including paper and card stocks, coatings/varnishes, die-cut shapes, embossing, foil stamping, and binding.

Print design also plays a crucial role in publishing, including book covers, magazine layouts, and official documents. Print design remains prevalent in society through all forms of communicative design. The importance of printed visual design was highlighted during the First World War, as posters helped to inform and instruct the audience. A short list of print design's uses today includes:

- Posters
- Brochures
- Flyers
- Presentation folders
- Packaging labels
- Business cards
- Rack cards
- Book covers
- Postcard
- Book design and layout
- Magazines
- Banners
- Receipts
- Shopping bags
