= Common man =

Common man may refer to:

- Commoner (or common people)
- The Common Man, a cartoon character by R. K. Laxman for "You Said It" in The Times of India
- The Common Man (film) (Dupont Lajoie), a 1975 French film
- A Common Man (film), a 2011 film starring Ben Cross and Ben Kingsley
- Common Man, 1997 Indian TV movie with Shreeram Lagoo and Sulabha Deshpande
- "Common Man", a song by John Conlee
- "Common Man", a song by David Ruffin from his eponymous 1973 album
- "Common Man", Zambian protest song by P.K. Chishala

== See also ==
- Commoner (disambiguation)
- Everyman (disambiguation)
- Ordinary Man (disambiguation)
- Ordinary People (disambiguation)
- Aam Aadmi, term in India for the common man
  - Aam Aadmi Party or Common Man Party, a political party in India
- Common Man's Front (Italian, Fronte dell'Uomo Qualunque), a short-lived right-wing populist, monarchist and anti-communist political party in Italy
- Fanfare for the Common Man, a 20th-century American classical music work by Aaron Copland
