= Uncommon =

Uncommon may refer to:

- Uncommon, 2015 American Christian drama film with Erik Estrada and Irma P. Hall
- "Uncommon", song by Madeline Kenney from Night Night at the First Landing 2017

== See also ==
- Common (disambiguation)
