= Everyman (comics) =

Everyman, in comics, may refer to:

- Everyman (DC Comics), a DC Comics character
- Everyman (Marvel Comics), a Marvel Comics character

== See also ==
- Everyman (disambiguation)
