= Optical disc packaging =

Case or other packaging used to protect optical discs

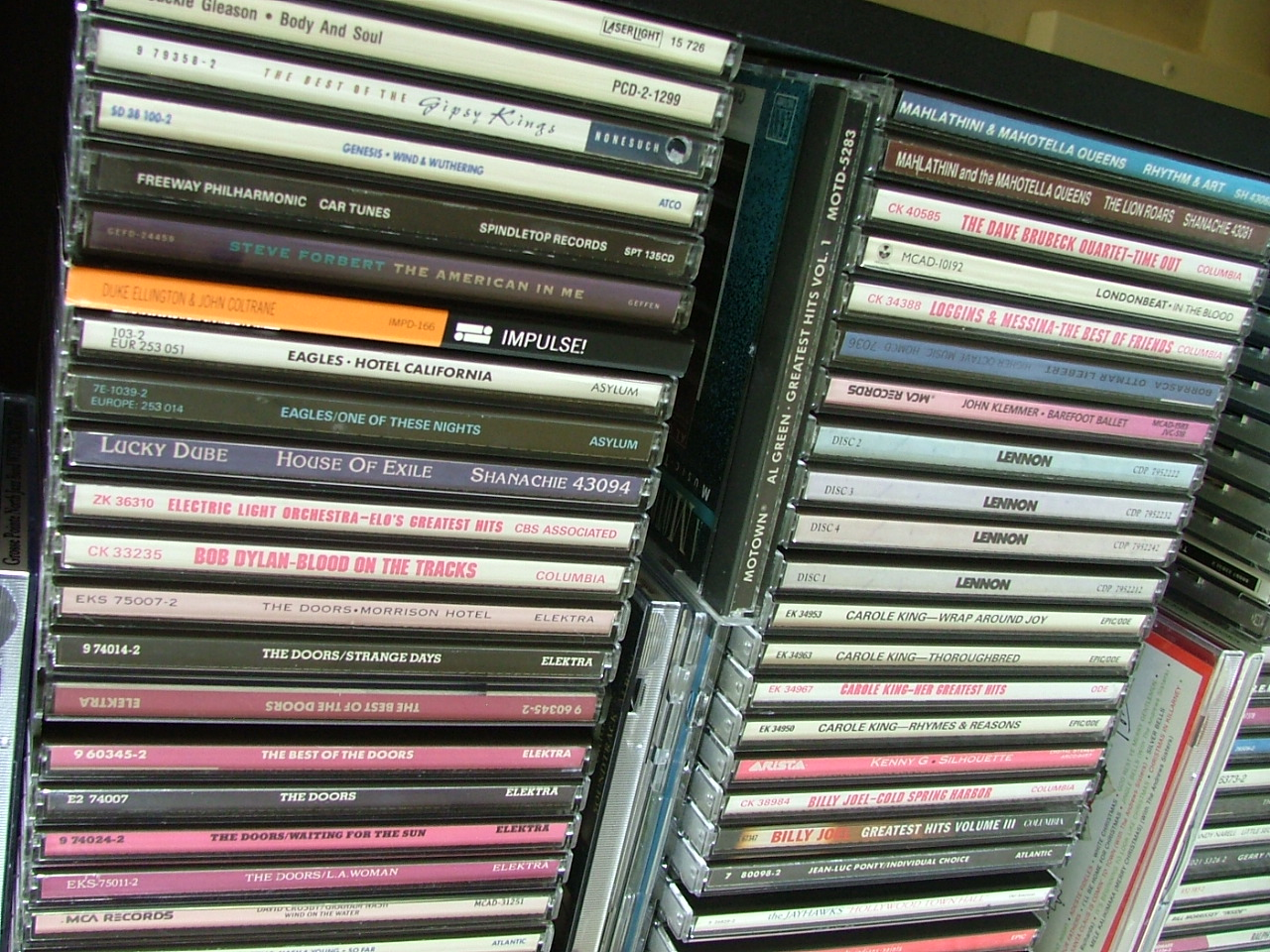
Stacks of compact disc jewel cases

Optical disc packaging is the packaging that accompanies compact discs, DVDs, and other formats of optical discs. Most packaging is rigid or semi-rigid and designed to protect the media from scratches and other types of exposure damage.

== Jewel case ==
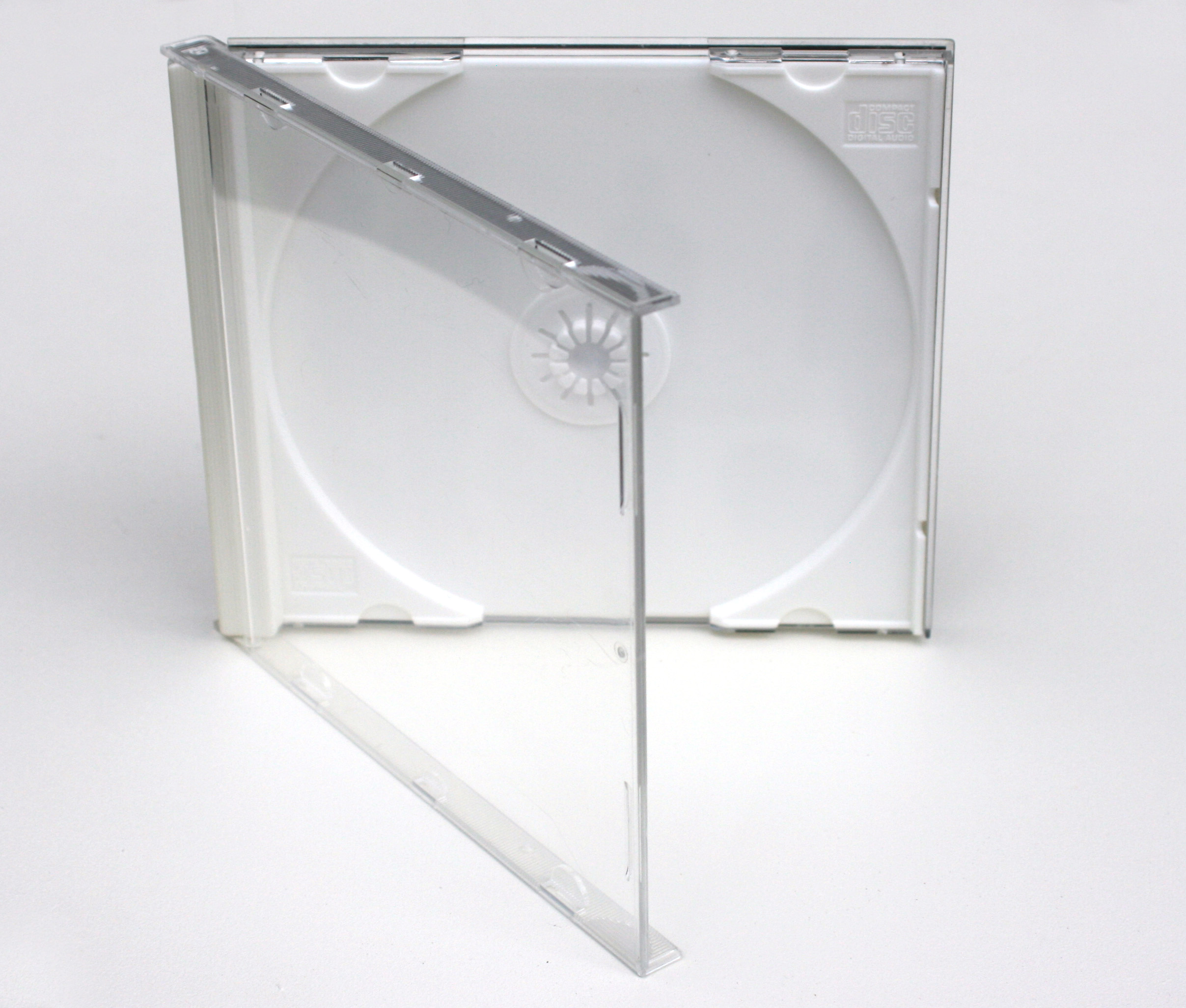
A jewel CD case

A jewel case is a compact disc case that has been used since the compact disc was first released in 1982. It is a three-piece plastic case, measuring 142 by 125 by 10 millimetres (5.59 in × 4.92 in × 0.39 in), a volume of 177.5 cubic centimetres (10.83 cu in), which usually contains a compact disc along with the liner notes and a back card. Two opposing transparent halves are hinged together to form the casing, the back half holding a media tray that grips the disc by its hole. All three parts are made of injection-moulded polystyrene.

Around 1993, there was a general shift to the tray being made of clear plastic instead of black or coloured.

The front lid contains two, four, or six tabs to keep any liner notes in place. The liner notes typically will be a 120 by 120 millimetres (4.7 in × 4.7 in) booklet, or a single 242 by 120 millimetres (9.5 in × 4.7 in) leaf folded in half. In addition, there is usually a back card, 150 by 118 millimetres (5.9 in × 4.6 in), underneath the media tray and visible through the clear back, often listing the track names, studio, copyright data and other information. The back card is folded into a flattened "U" shape, with the sides being visible along the ends (often referred to as the spine) of the case. The ends usually have the name of the release and the artist, and often label or catalogue information printed on them, and are designed to be visible when the case is stored vertically, 'book-style', on shelves.

The rear media tray snaps into the back cover and is responsible for securing the CD. This is achieved by a central circular hub of spring-loaded teeth that grip and effectively suspend the disc above the tray surface, preventing the recording surface from being scratched.

The jewel case is the standard case used by the majority of manufacturers and it is the most common type of case found in record and movie stores. Jewel cases are occasionally used for DVDs, but generally not for those that contain major film releases. Blank Blu-ray media is also most commonly sold in standard-width jewel cases.

=== Origin ===
According to Philips, the name "jewel case" reflects either the generally high quality of the case design compared to initial attempts, or its appearance. According to one publication, initial attempts at packaging CDs were unsatisfactory. When the new design, by Peter Doodson, was found to be "virtually perfect" it was dubbed the "jewel case". Another publication quotes Doodson describing that he "specified polished ribs as they pick up the light and shine" and states that the resulting appearance led to the name.

=== Strengths ===
The CD jewel case has a tight grip on the CD because of the tray's "teeth" or "lock". Because of this, even if the CD jewel case is turned upside down, left, or right, the CD is held in place. Flimsier cases may let the CD become loose or even fall out. Also, since the jewel case is made of plastic, it is sturdier than cardboard, paper, or foams. When pressure is applied to the CD jewel case, the case will break before the CD. If the case is made of thin cardboard, there is a greater chance that the CD would break or get damaged, because the weight is directed onto it.

The material of the CD jewel case allows storage of CDs for decades without ruining the CDs. The same is less true of other cases, since paper can stick to the CDs due to air, humidity, and other factors. The CD jewel case may also be preferred because it offers orderliness on a shelf. Since the CD jewel case has existed for decades, there are many CD shelves, racks, and other products on the market that are made for CD jewel cases.

The CD jewel case is designed to carry a booklet, as well as to have panel inserts. These may be used to display album artwork, lyrics, photos, thank-yous, messages, biography, etc.

Because the CD jewel case is the standard and most commonly used CD case, it is much cheaper. The price of the CD jewel case usually ranges from $0.75 to $0.95. That is a few cents cheaper than digipaks and other CD wallets. However, if large quantities of cases are needed, the price difference may be hundreds or thousands of US dollars.

=== Weaknesses ===
There are a number of shortcomings with the jewel case. The case is hinged on two brittle plastic arms, which often break if the case receives shock or stress due to being dropped. The teeth of the hub holding the disc are also prone to failure by snapping. There is a problem with the tabs ("half-moons") that hold the liner notes in place; sometimes, especially with larger booklets, the tabs grip the booklet too tightly, leading to tearing. When replacing the booklet, it can get snagged and crumple or rip. As noted above, some CD releases have only two tabs, which allows the booklet to be more easily removed and replaced, with the disadvantage of the booklet sometimes falling out if held incorrectly. Replacement jewel cases can be purchased to replace those that have broken plastic arms or hub teeth.

=== Variations ===
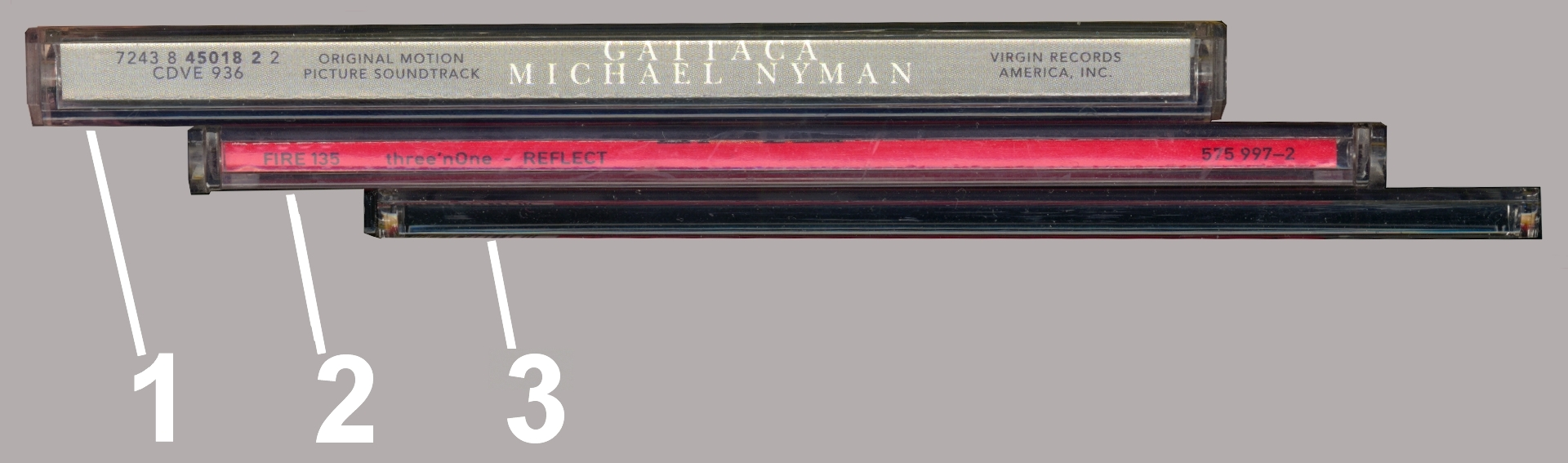
Jewel case types: 1. Original jewel case; 2. CD-single; 3. Slimcase

Double-disc albums can be packaged either in standard-thickness jewel cases with hinged media trays which can be lifted to reveal the second disc (trays hinged on the left are known as "Smart Tray" format; those hinged on the right are known as "Brilliant Box" format) or in a chubby jewel case, sometimes called a multi-CD jewel case, which is slightly thicker than two normal jewel cases stacked on top of each other and can hold from two to six CDs. Chubby jewel cases do not fit in some CD racks; however, some racks have a few extra-wide slots specifically to accommodate them.

Jewel cases for CDs released early in the format's life featured frosted top and bottom spines as opposed to the ridged ones more commonly used. As a result of their rarity, these types of jewel cases are fairly coveted among collectors.

"Super Jewel Box" is a more advanced design that offers, amongst other improvements, a greatly strengthened hinge area. The disc tray is also deeper, allowing two discs to be placed on top of each other. The super jewel box cannot be used as a direct replacement for the older jewel case design as its card insert for the back is slightly different in size and shape. The super jewel box was developed by Philips and it was intended to be the successor to the original jewel case. Some CD manufacturers (for example, the high-end company Linn) are supplying them. The super jewel box is the conventional case for Super Audio CD (SACD) releases; a taller "Plus" size, midway between CD and DVD-Video size, is the conventional case for DVD-Audio, and as of mid-2006, the case format for all albums released by the Universal Music Group in Europe.

Many alternatives to the standard jewel case may also be found, including larger DVD-style cases with a more book-like shape. It is not uncommon to find CDs housed in custom cases, tins and boxes of varying shapes and sizes. Slipcases and other envelope-type designs are also occasionally used.

Some DualDiscs are packaged in jewel cases of a somewhat different design from the CD version; the inside edge is rounded instead of flat, and the physical position of the disc is moved slightly toward the spine to make room for a latch mechanism. The overall dimensions of a DualDisc case are roughly the same as a standard CD case. However, the hinge mechanism is smaller and cannot be dismantled as easily as on a standard jewel case.

Smaller jewel cases are used for 8 cm CD and DVD media; similar cases without the hub are used for MiniDisc and (magnetic) Zip drive media.

Additionally, larger jewel cases that were around the size of VHS keep cases were used for North American releases of games for the Sega CD, all North American releases of Sega Saturn games, and games released early in the original PlayStation's life cycle. Because the larger thickness of these cases puts the CDs inside at greater risk of being accidentally knocked out of their hubs, large foam bricks were placed on top of the discs when packaged to hold them in place.

PAL-region releases of PlayStation games used a distinct range of jewel case formats that differed from those used in North America and Japan. The standard PAL jewel case measured 18 mm thick, thicker than the standard audio CD jewel case, and came with a black plastic disk tray with the PlayStation logo embossed on the front left side. This format was standardised by Sony for PAL territories from 1997 onward. Prior to standardisation, a small number of early PAL releases appeared in cardboard cases or in the Carthuplas Brilliant Maxibox, a shorter black-bordered case manufactured in Belgium. Throughout the lifespan of the PlayStation console, a family of multiway jewel cases, capable of holding two to five discs, was used for multi-disc releases.

=== Slimline jewel case ===
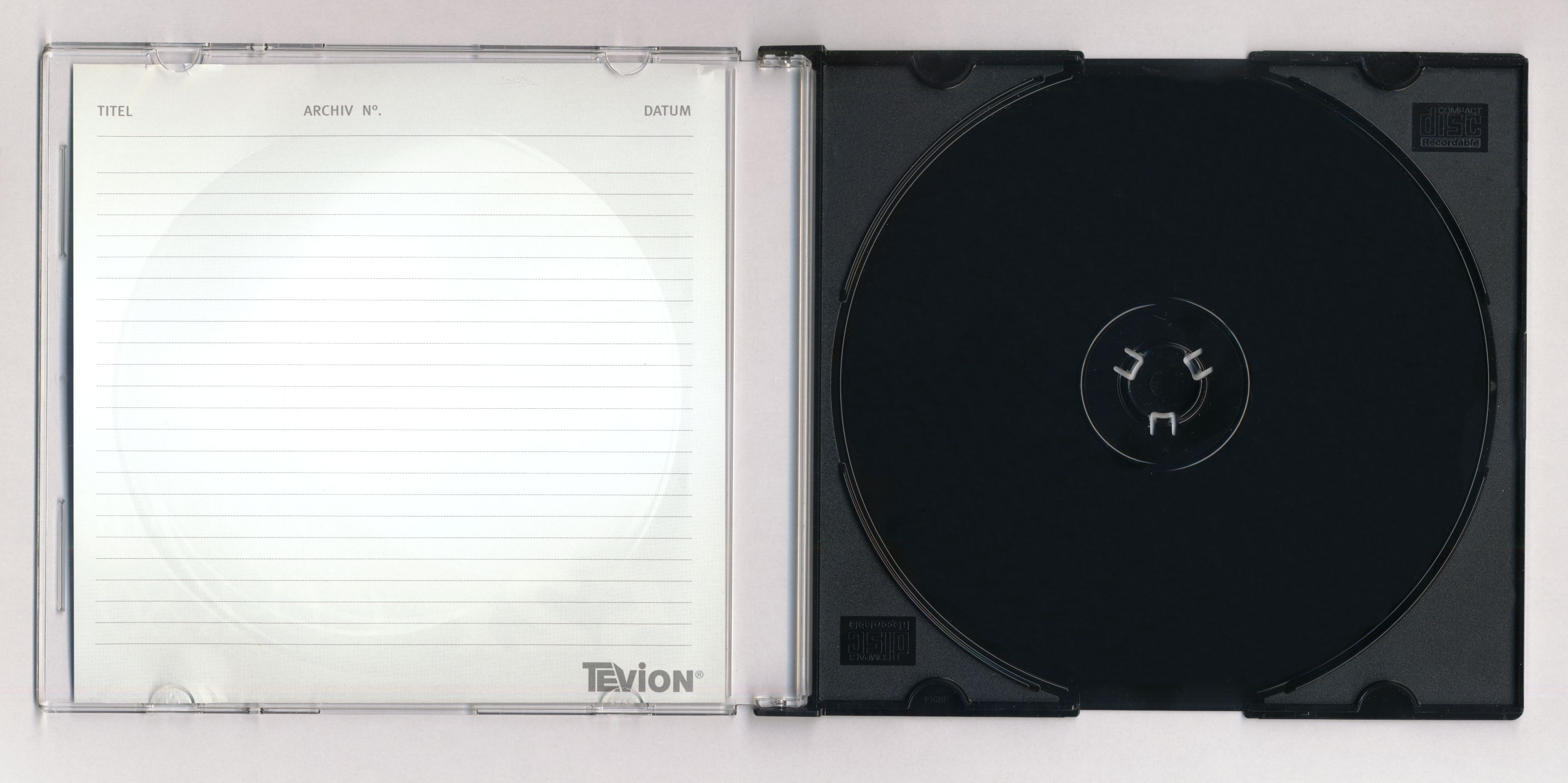
A "black side" slim case

Slimline jewel cases first became popular for CD singles sold in Japan and Europe, and have become a common space-saving packaging for burned CDs. The cases used for CD singles sold in Japan and Europe are 7 mm thick, with a "J-card" type inlay, showing cover art through the front of the case, and also through both the spine and part of the back of the case. The CD itself is usually inserted upside down in the case so that the artwork on the disc itself shows through the transparent back of the case.

Most slim jewel cases sold for burned CDs use the measure 142 by 125 by 5 millimetres (5.59 in × 4.92 in × 0.20 in), which is roughly half the thickness of a standard CD jewel case, allowing twice as many CDs to be stored in the same space, and will generally fit two to a slot in a standard CD rack. They generally do not have room for a full package insert booklet, only a slip of paper for a track listing or cover art, showing only through the front of the case. Unlike the standard jewel cases, slimline cases are made of two pieces rather than three and do not have a place for a back label. However, with this design, the spine is narrower, making the discs more difficult to identify when stored on edge on a shelf.

== External marketing packaging ==
In the U.S. and Canada, the jewel box of a music CD was originally packaged for retail sale in a large cardboard box called a longbox in order to fit in store fixtures designed for vinyl records, offer larger space for display of artwork and marketing blurbs, and deter shoplifting. This packaging was much-criticized as environmentally wasteful and was eventually dropped by most retailers in the mid-1990s.

Around 1994, the top wrap-around label sticker began to appear on most CDs, to make it easier to read what each CD was from the top without having to flip through them to see the front cover. These stickers were usually nothing more than informational labels and rarely would have any use in the marketing of the album. The wrap-around sticker also provided an extra seal, possibly as another theft deterrent.

A chiefly Japanese packaging addition is the inclusion of an obi strip, a J-card–esque paperboard slip wound around the left side of the case to show details such as the price, artist, etc.

== Paper or Tyvek sleeve ==
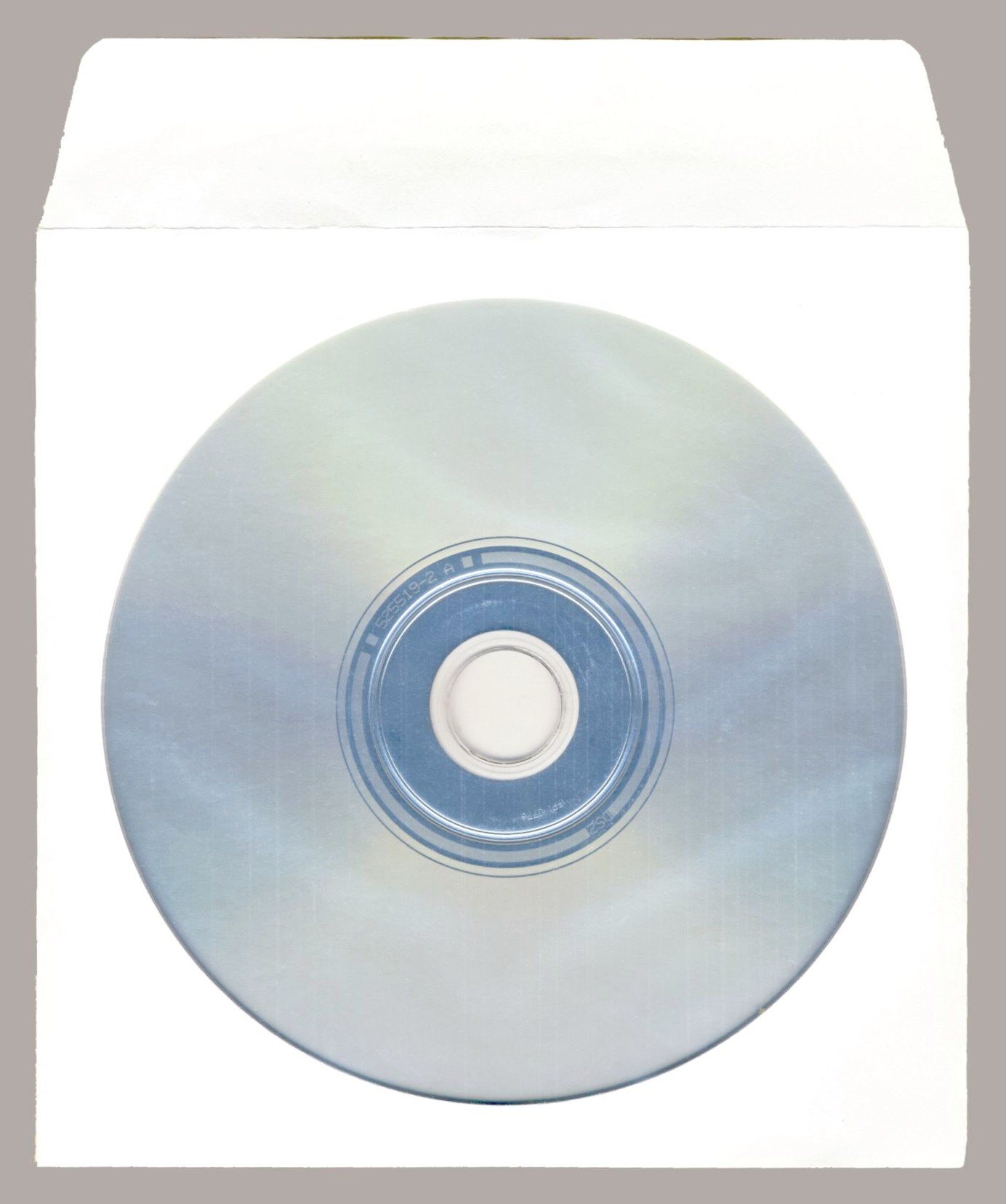
Paper sleeve

The simplest, least expensive package is a paper envelope. More expensive versions add a transparent window to the envelope, allowing the disc label to be seen. The envelope can also be made out of spun-bonded polyethylene (trade-named Tyvek), which is stronger and lighter than paper and is resistant to moisture.

== Q Pack ==
The Q Pack was developed by the Queens Group Inc. in the mid-1990s as an alternative to regular CD jewel cases. (The Queens Group was purchased by Shorewood Packaging, which is part of International Paper.) The Q Pack does not have a snap-in tray like a regular jewel case. It is characterized by the corrugated raised area where the top hinges to the back. Since Q Pack cases are not transparent, generally, cover art is applied as a decal to the cover. Decals can also be applied to the inside front, on the tray underneath the hub and the back cover. A slot for an insert booklet is inside the front cover, as in typical jewel cases.

== Digipak/Digipack ==
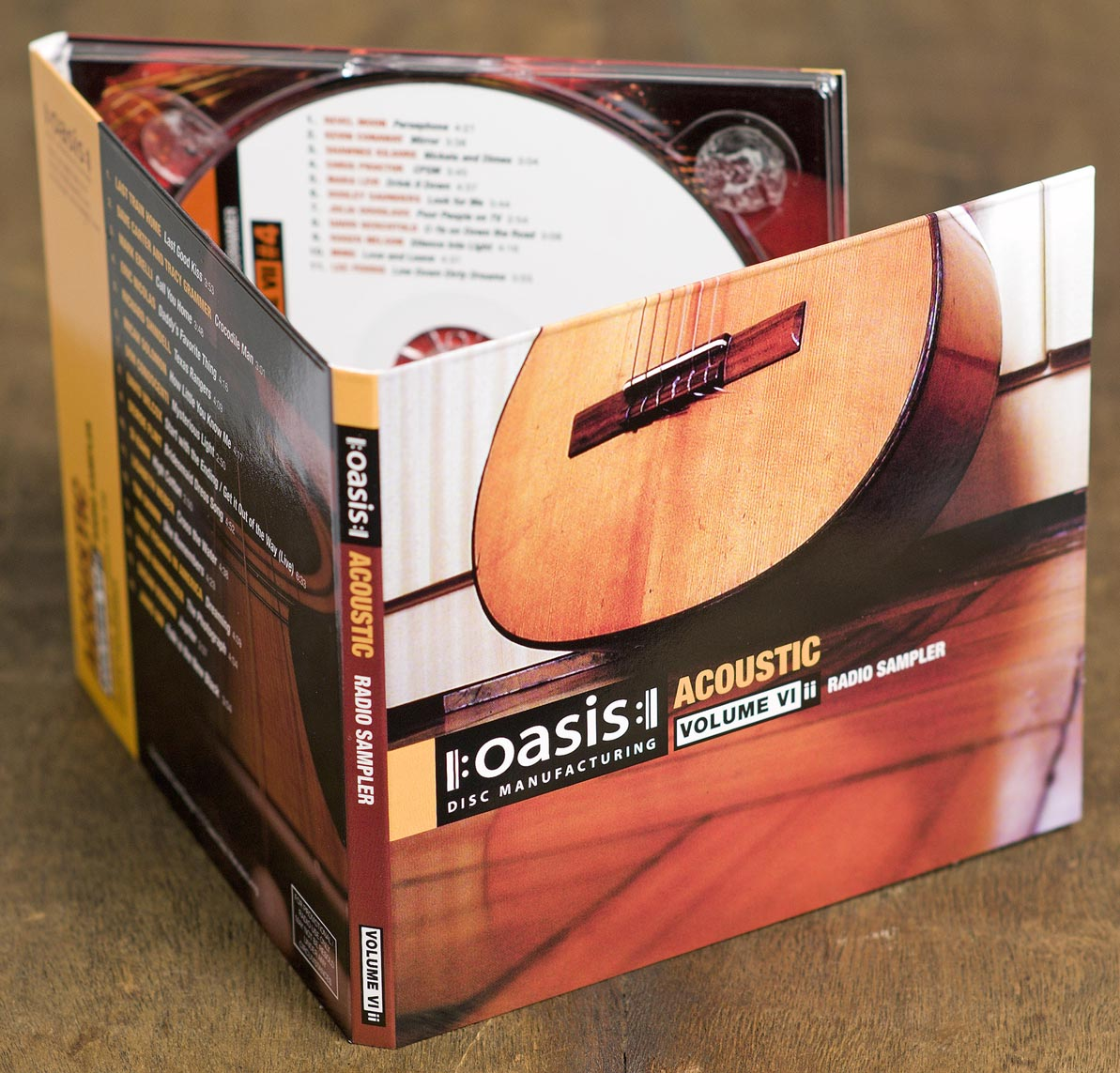
A 6-panel digipak

A digipak or digipack (generic term) is a rectangular cardboard package with one or more plastic trays capable of holding a disc attached to the inside. There are variations where the disc(s) sit on a hub or spindle inside and come in various sizes. A digipak-style case is a common alternative to the jewel case. The term digipak was once a trademarked name but is no longer active as of March 2020 according to the United States Patent and Trademark Office.

== FLPpak ==
Similar in concept to Digipak, an FLPpak consists of a wrap-around outer shell made of cardboard, bonded to a plastic CD tray. However, FLPpak differs in two significant ways:

First, while Digipak cases extend their cardboard shells taller than their trays to keep the tray as hidden as possible when closed, FLPpak packages extend their trays beyond the cardboard and incorporate top and bottom edges, sacrificing aesthetic flexibility for increased protection from shelf wear. (These end-caps are extended far enough that, when lying on a flat surface, the plastic top and bottom edges will suspend the front or back above it.)

Second, by incorporating a latching closure into the right edge of the tray, avoiding the need for an extra component such as a slip cover to keep the package from coming open.

FLPpak Logo

Though now expired, the design was originally covered by US patent 5188230 and US patent 5372253, held by the Ivy Hill Corporation. These numbers can be found moulded into the inner surface of the closure.

Packages of this type, which were manufactured by Ivy Hill, can also be identified by the FLP logo moulded into the bottom-left and top-right corners of the disc tray. This logo was covered by U.S. trademark number 74419766, cancelled as of August 13, 2005.

== Digisleeve ==
A digisleeve consists of a rectangular cardboard package which differs from a digipak in that it does not have a tray, spindle or hub, and the disc or discs slide into an outside pocket of the packaging.

== Digifile ==
A digifile consists of a rectangular cardboard package that is similar to a digisleeve except that the disc or discs slide vertically (and in some cases diagonally) into a horizontal or diagonal slot inside the packaging.

== Wallet ==
A wallet consists of a rectangular cardboard package that is similar to a digisleeve, except that the disc or discs slide horizontally into a vertical slot inside the packaging.

== Digibook/mediabook ==
A digibook/mediabook is a type of packaging that has a hard cover (like a hardbound book) and comes in various sizes. The disc can either slide into the package or sit on a spindle, hub or tray inside.

== Artbook/earbook ==
An artbook/earbook is essentially an oversized deluxe digibook/mediabook: a type of packaging that has a hard cover (like a hardbound book) and is typically (but not always) around 11 1/4 in (290 mm) to 11 1/2 in (290 mm) square and contains a several-page booklet inside.

== Mini LP sleeve/paper sleeve ==
A mini LP sleeve/paper sleeve is a square cardboard package that looks like a miniaturized version of an LP jacket. The disc usually slides into an inner sleeve whose opening need not match the outer sleeve in the manner of actual LPs. Mini LP sleeves can either appear as single sleeves or gatefolds, identically to full-sized LP jackets, with both variants being used for a number of music releases.

While used in a somewhat limited capacity in the West, where the jewel case remains the most popular form of CD packaging, mini LP sleeves are common for reissues of older albums in Japan, with their typically high level of faithfulness to the original vinyl record packaging making them sought-after among collectors.

The downside to this format is that the disc can be easily scratched each time it is taken out; a more serious issue can be that if the glue that keeps the sleeve that holds the CD closed on the side closest to the spine (on gatefold covers) weakens, it can get onto the CD, rendering it unplayable. For these reasons, mini LP releases—particularly Japanese ones—enclose the CD in a protective sleeve made from matted plastic or washi paper. Another disadvantage with mini LP sleeves is that, like digipaks, they are significantly more vulnerable to wear and other forms of damage than standard jewel cases and are more difficult to replace.

One advantage of mini LP sleeves is that album covers that were originally textured, such as Back in Black by AC/DC or Fear of Music by Talking Heads, can retain the texturing on the CD release, as well as being able to replicate other nuances of the vinyl packaging such as unusually shaped packaging or artwork intended to span the whole of a gatefold (e.g. Obscured by Clouds and The Dark Side of the Moon, respectively, by Pink Floyd). In addition, the packaging is more environmentally friendly due to the use of more easily recyclable and biodegradable cardboard (as opposed to the polystyrene used in jewel cases) and is significantly cheaper to produce than both jewel cases and digipaks, which has made them a more favourable option in markets where CD sales are declining.

== Minipack ==
A minipack is a square cardboard package in which the disc sits on a spindle, hub or tray, essentially a combination of a digipak and mini LP sleeve. This type of packaging is usually handmade and is not seen very often.

== JakeBox ==
JakeBox is a paperboard packaging concept designed in Sweden, featuring a pop-up "claw". The claw releases the CD when the cover is opened and locks it again when the cover is closed. This design makes the disc easily accessible and protects the CD once the case is closed.

== Discbox slider ==
The discbox slider (also called DBS) is a disc packaging concept in 100% carton board, found both in CD and DVD-sized packaging formats. The DBS is comparable with plastic jewel or amaray cases in size but holds more of the features of the LP-style cases in terms of light weight and printability. The DBS case opens up from the side by moving the slider part (on which the disc is resting) from the sleeve. The discbox slider is 100% recyclable. Many covermount CDs released in the British magazine Mixmag used to be packaged in a discbox slider, after replacing a standard jewel box, although the discbox slider itself was replaced by a simple cardboard sleeve.

== Compac Plus ==
The Compac Plus or Compact Plus is a disc packaging similar in style to a digipak. However, it consists of two plastic CD trays which "clip" together like a normal slipcase. The packaging was introduced in the early 1990s. It was originally a brand that had its own logo and was used by bands such as Blur, but as years progressed, many other artists used their own version of the packaging.

== Keep case ==
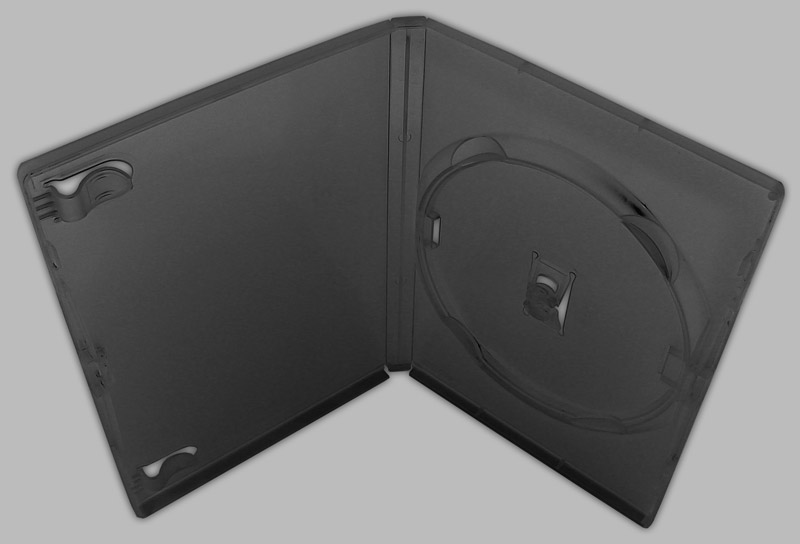
A keep case

A keep case is the most common type of DVD packaging and was created by Amaray. It is taller and thicker than a jewel case, and is made of much softer, less brittle plastic (polypropylene rather than polystyrene), so it does not break as easily. They usually hold one or two discs but are capable of holding up to six discs. Slimmer keep cases, so-called slim-paks or thinpaks, are typically used for DVD box sets consisting of the thin keep cases stored in a paperboard box. The thin cases are half as thick and can generally only hold one disc as a result, but newer slim cases have central disc-holding teeth on both sides. The teeth are made in such a way that when the case is closed, they go into the gaps between the teeth on the other side.

A standard DVD case is a single-piece plastic case with two creases, which folds around and snaps closed. It measures 135 mm × 190 mm × 14 mm (5.31 in × 7.48 in × 0.55 in). It is wrapped on the outside by a thin piece of transparent plastic that can hold a paper label. The label measures 284 mm × 184 mm (11.2 in × 7.2 in).

Some DVD releases have a paperboard outer sleeve around the shrink wrap.

Beginning in 2007, prerecorded Blu-ray and HD DVD titles ship in packages similar to but slightly smaller (18.5 mm shorter and 1 mm thinner: 135 mm × 171.5 mm × 13 mm) than a standard DVD keep case, generally with the format logo prominently displayed in a horizontal stripe across the top of the case (red for HD DVD; and PlayStation 3 Greatest Hits Games, blue for Blu-ray, and clear for regular PlayStation 3 and Nintendo Switch cartridge games). Green cases of this variety were introduced to be used for titles released for the Xbox One gaming system, though with the space intended for placing the disc being on the left side of the inner case, while most other keep cases have it on the right.

== Snap case ==
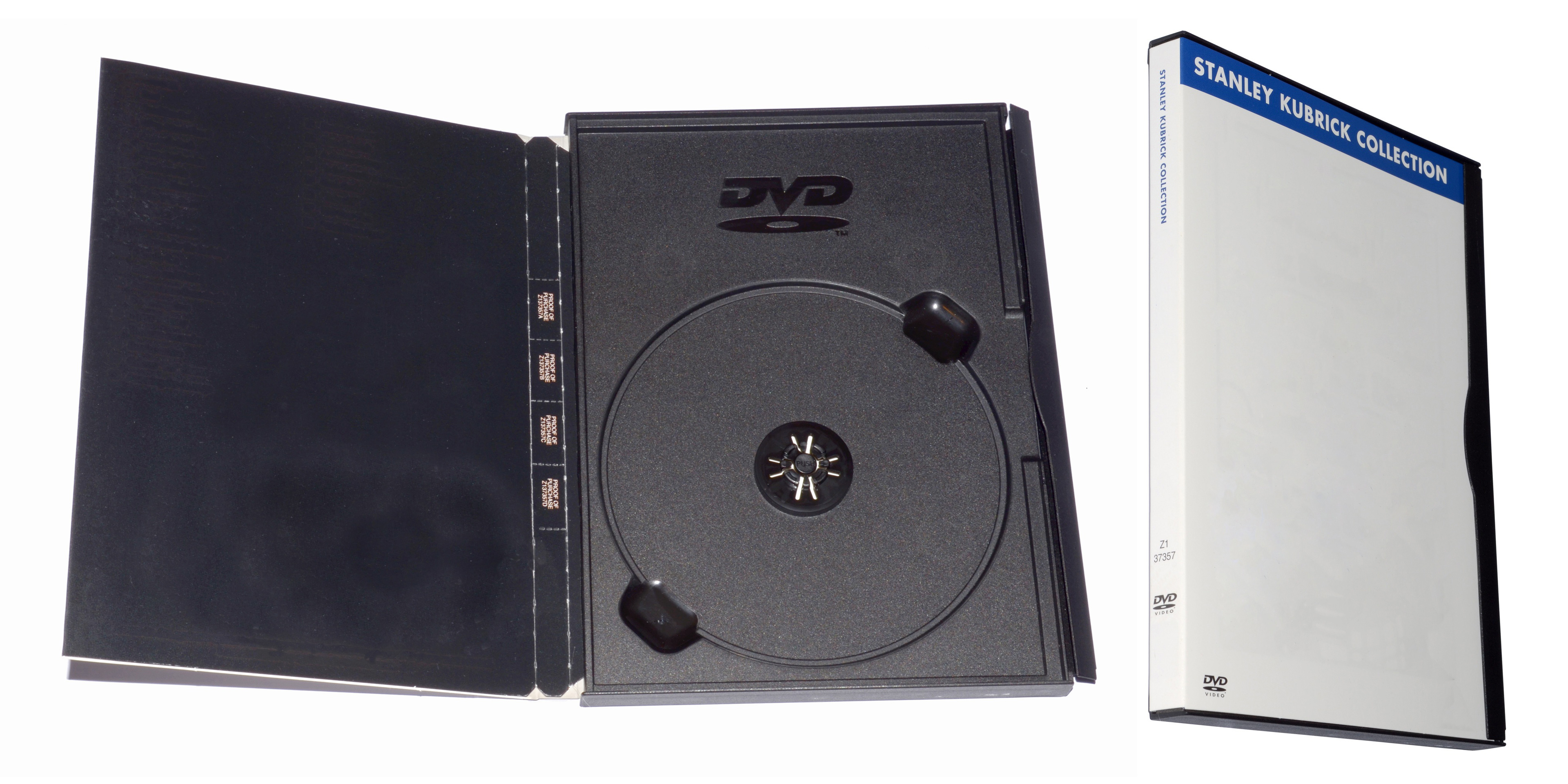
A DVD snap case. The original artwork has been digitally removed from these photos.

A snap case is a design for both CD and DVD packaging, and is made in the standard sizes for both. Each is made of a single-piece plastic tray and closure, which snaps over the right edge of the front flap. The printed flap is made of thin paperboard which wraps around the left edge and across the back of the tray, to which it is glued. It has largely been replaced with the DVD keep case and CD jewel case due to its flimsy design. Time Warner's two studios and their boutique labels (Warner Bros. Pictures and New Line Cinema) were the only major entities to utilize this case design for DVD packaging.

== Soft case/green case ==
Soft cases, also known as earth cases or green cases, are soft-shell cases made from recycled optical discs. They are considerably more pliable than other style cases, given that they are made from various mixes of plastics. They are sold by various companies as replacements for disc owners who are environmentally friendly and can be differentiated from other cases by their opaque appearance. The softness of the cases leads them to break less, though the safety of the enclosed disc may be somewhat sacrificed, since the case can be bent end-to-end easily.

== SteelBook ==
SteelBook is a trademarked name for a disc case constructed from durable metal to create a tin box-style package similar in size and shape to the keep case. It is used in memorabilia sets such as collector's editions, and commonly printed with full-color artwork, varnished, and embossed to provide additional visual dimensionality.

== Eco pack ==
In 2006, Universal Music Group introduced the first completely paper-recyclable CD case, called the "eco pack". The sleeve is printed on recycled card stock and the tray is made from International Paper's PaperFoam. Universal used this packaging for issues in its 20th Century Masters — The Millennium Collection series after 2006.

== Lift-lock case ==
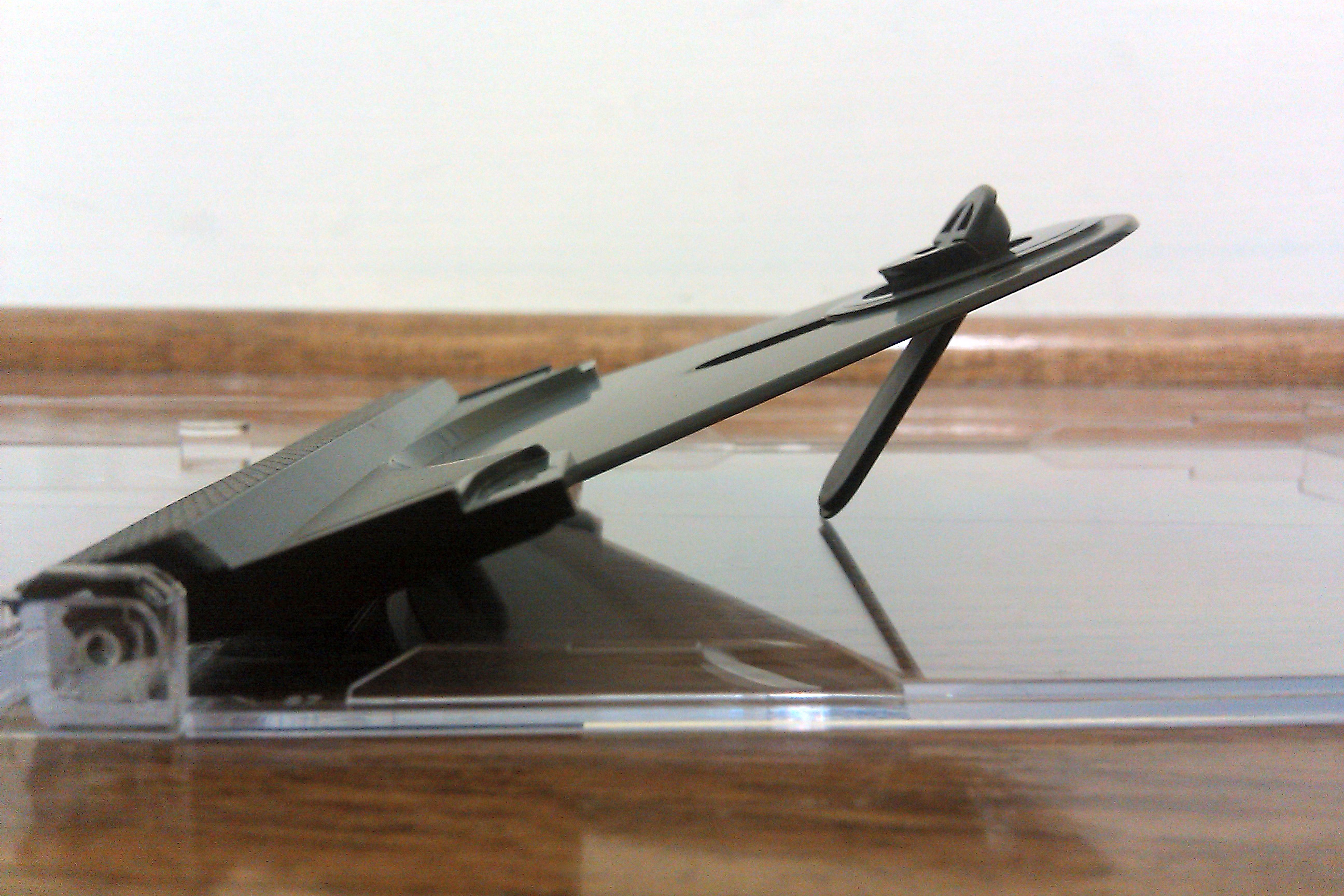
A lift-lock case viewed from the side, showing the latch mechanism

Many gold compact discs, including those from Mobile Fidelity Sound Lab, are packaged in lift-lock cases, a special type of case where the CD is lifted out of the case automatically and a latch unlocked when opened. The advantage of this design is that only the edges of the disc are handled when removing it from the case, and the disc is never subjected to any bending force while being removed. From the outside, they appear almost identical to a standard jewel case. They have the same dimensions as a standard jewel case, and use standard booklets and back cards.

== Spindles and other bulk packaging ==
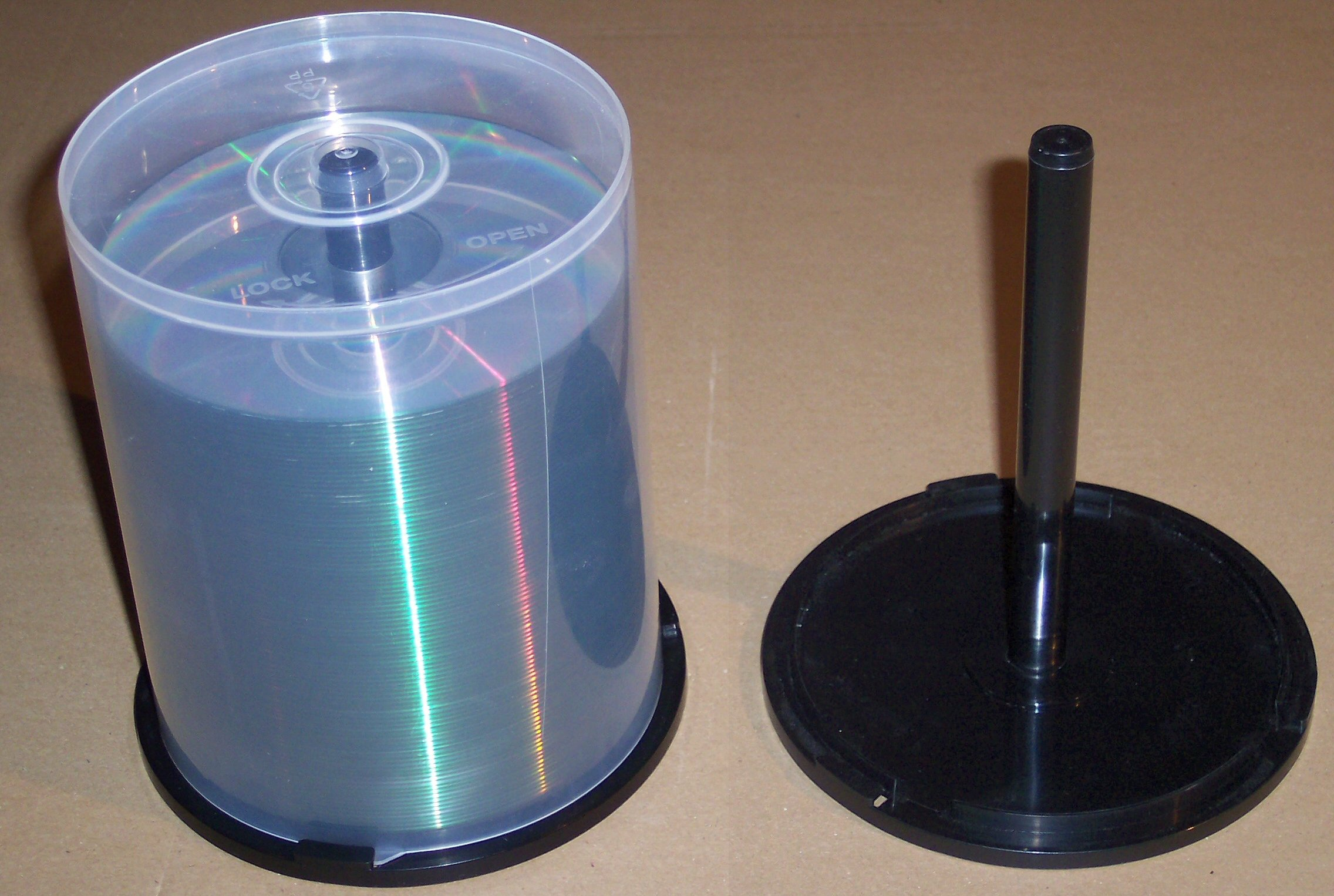
100-disc cake box and spindle

Blank CD and DVD media are often sold in bulk packages called spindles or, less formally, cake boxes. This type of packaging consists of a round, clear plastic cup that mates bayonet-style to a base with a central post that holds a stack of discs (both made from polypropylene); dummy discs made of clear polycarbonate with no recording surface are often packed on the ends of the stack to avoid scratches from contact with the hard plastic of the packages. Such packages have been designed to hold anywhere from ten up to 100 discs and offer the user multiple options for packaging the finalized disc.

TDK and Memorex have begun selling some of their blank media in what they call "Snap n' Save" cases, essentially polyethylene cases designed to hold up to ten discs in a package.

Finally, some bulk packages of blank media forgo a permanent container completely, instead using a simple blister pack for small numbers of media, or bundling large numbers of discs in shrink wrap to reduce waste.

== Multi-disc albums ==
Record shops and consumer electronics stores sell albums or books that contain numerous soft plastic sleeves, which can be used to store CDs, DVDs, Blu-ray discs, video game discs, and other discs. Some of the small books or albums can hold 12 discs. Some of the large albums or books can hold over 90 discs. The owner can either keep the original packaging (cases, booklets, etc.) or discard them.

== See also ==
- Caddy (hardware) – Plastic enclosure used historically for optical media
- Video game packaging – Physical storage of the contents of a video game
- Presentation folder – Folder may include slits or pockets for optical discs
