= Printing.com =

printing.com is a UK-based printing company. Started in 1992, it has over 300 franchises in the UK and Ireland which are served from its production facility in Trafford Park, Manchester, UK. It is the largest high-street print franchise in the UK.

printing.com is quoted on the London Stock exchange and also has stores in France, the Netherlands, the USA and New Zealand. The company has four routes to market: Online, Franchise Stores, Bolt-on Franchises and Company owned Stores. In March 2019 printing.com bolt-on franchise Artichoke Design Ltd is acquired by Grafenia Plc. Artichoke Design Ltd was founded and operated by brothers Richard Morris and David Morris.

== Online channels ==
printing.com’s acquisition of the Dutch online printing company MFG BV was reported to the London Stock Exchange on 8 November 2010. The company consequently acquired the websites Flyerzone.nl, Drukland.nl and Printrepublic.nl.

printing.com launched its first UK web2print channel, BrandDemand, at the start of 2011.

The intended launch of the UK version of the Flyerzone.nl site, Flyerzone.co.uk, was reported at the end of July 2011 via printing.com's AGM Statement. The French version of the Flyerzone site, Flyerzone.fr, was launched in August 2011. The following year the company announced plans to add their template software to this site in the final quarter of 2012.

printing.com's web2print software and systems use InDesign Server technology to build print design templates. On 7 November 2011 printing.com’s CEO, Tony Rafferty, reported the launch of a further website, TemplateCloud.com. The aim of this site is to establish an online library of editable print design templates crowdsourced from freelance designers to be resold on a royalty basis. In 2015 Printing.com sold the websites Drukland.nl, Drukland.be, Flyerzone.nl and Printrepublic.nl to Simian B.V. for a total of EUR 2.4 million.
