= Jedermann =

Jedermann (a German word, whose English meaning is "everyone" or "anyone" or "Everyman") may refer to:

- Jedermann (play), a 1911 Austrian play by Hugo von Hofmannsthal
- Jedermann (film), a 1961 film based on the Hofmannsthal play
- Jedermann (Sibelius), 1916 incidental music by Jean Sibelius to the Hofmannsthal play

== See also ==
- Sechs Monologe aus Jedermann (Six monologues from Jedermann, 1943–44)), songs by Frank Martin
- Everyman (disambiguation)
