= Branford Price Millar Library =

Library on the Portland State University campus in Portland, Oregon, U.S.

Portland State University Library
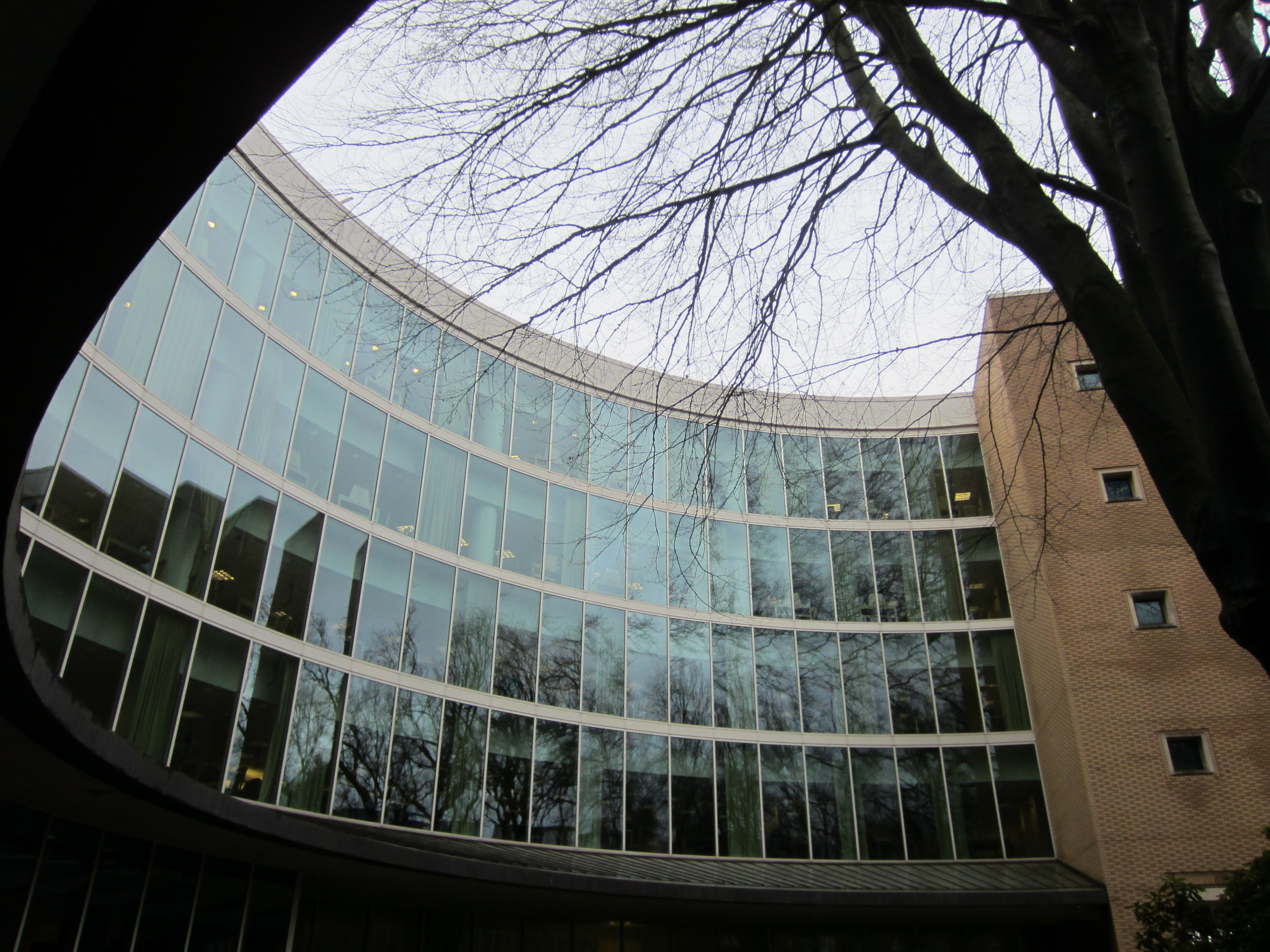
- Library building from the South Park Blocks
- 45.51158°N 122.68611°W
- Location: Portland State University; Portland, Oregon, U.S.
- Type: Academic library
- Established: 1968
- Branches: 1

Collection
- Size: 1,430,929 print volumes

Access and use
- Circulation: 162,244 (2014-2015)

Other information
- Employees: 59
- Website: library.pdx.edu
- Portland State College Library
- Oregon Historic Site
- Portland Significant Resource

The Branford Price Millar Library is the library of Portland State University (PSU) in Portland, Oregon, United States. Built in 1968, the academic library was doubled in size in 1991 and houses over 1 million volumes. The five-story building is located on the school's campus on the South Park Blocks in Downtown Portland and is the largest academic library in the Portland area.

== History ==
In 1959, the first PSU library building, Library East, was completed under the presidency of Branford Millar, second president of Portland State College, serving from 1959 to 1968. That library had its 1 millionth visitor in 1962 and was replaced in 1968 with the Branford P. Millar Memorial Library. Portland State was known as Portland State College until 1969.

In August 1989, construction began on an $11 million expansion of the library that doubled the size of the facility. Constructed by Wildish Building Company and designed by architectural firm Skidmore, Owings & Merrill, the expansion added the curved glass wall on the east face of the building providing views of the South Park Blocks. Paid for by the state of Oregon, the expansion also remodeled the existing structure. The 72,000-square-foot (6,700 m^{2}) addition was completed in 1991 with a dedication ceremony held on November 3, 1991. At that time, the library contained 850,000 volumes.

In 1992, the library joined a Portland area electronic library network. A former library employee was convicted of embezzling more than $200,000 from the library in 1997. The Copper Beech (Fagus sylvatica f. purpurea) tree in front of the Library was designated a Portland Heritage Tree by the Portland City Council in 1995. It was planted in about 1890 by the family of Joseph Franklin Watson in front of their home. After demolishing the home and preserving the tree in the mid 1960s for the first phase of the library, the decision to build around the tree was made in March or April 1986 on the recommendation of architects Skidmore, Owings & Merrill, PSU's Library Addition Committee, the campus community, and the city’s foresters.

The Millar Library was remodeled in 2001 at a cost of $2.8 million to create a learning center, technology upgrades, and new furnishings. Funds came from private donations, the state, and the federal government.

The library launched the Oregon Sustainable Community Digital Library in 2005 to contain land use planning documents created in Oregon. Until 2007, Millar Library served as the state's Regional Federal Depository Library when it became one of four libraries sharing the collection.

== Building ==
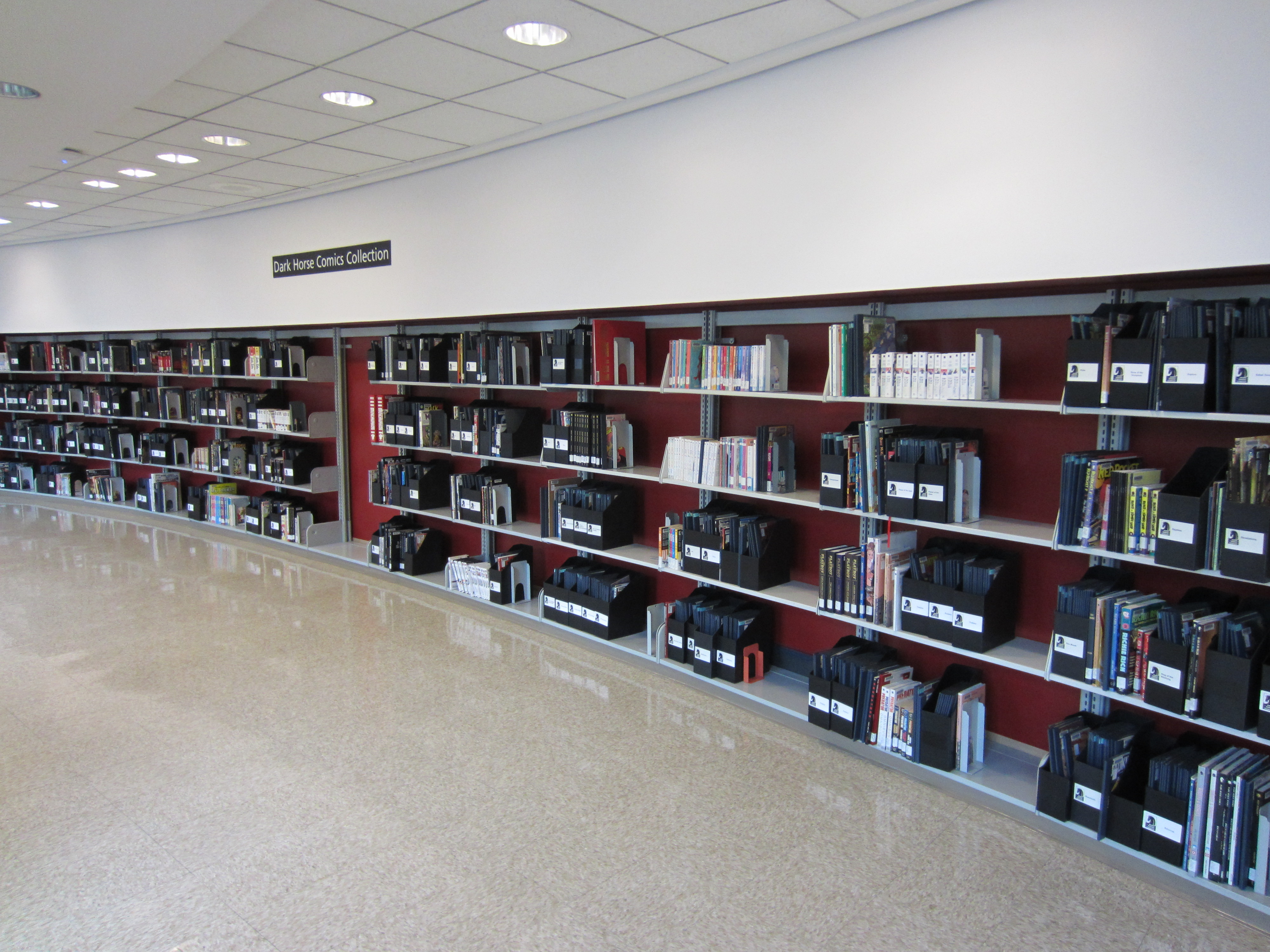
Dark Horse Comics collection

Branford Price Millar Library is housed in a six-story building on the PSU campus. The building includes a curved exterior wall covered with ceiling-to-floor windows on the eastern side of the building, wrapping around a copper beech tree planted on the site in the 1800s. Tan colored bricks are used for the other exterior walls. Inside, the library contains study rooms, a computer lab, offices, and the school's archives office in addition to the library's collections. With 194,783 square feet (18,095.9 m^{2}) of space, the library is the largest academic library in the Portland metropolitan area and covers an entire city block.

== Collections ==
The library has a total of 1,430,929 print volumes in its collections and an annual circulation of 162,244 items (in 2014-2-15). In 2014-2015, the library received 1,076,571 visitors. PSU Library houses archival materials relating to the Hanford Site and Trojan Nuclear Power Plant, and it is a federal depository library. The library is also a member of the Orbis Cascade Alliance. The library holds the Dark Horse Comic Collection, a gift from Dark Horse that brings two copies of every comic book, graphic novel, figurine, and more published and produced by publisher Dark Horse.

The library manages PDXScholar, the open access, digital, institutional repository for the university.

== See also ==
- 2024 Portland State University pro-Palestinian campus occupation
- The Knowledge (mural)
