= Handout =

Material distributed freely to those in need

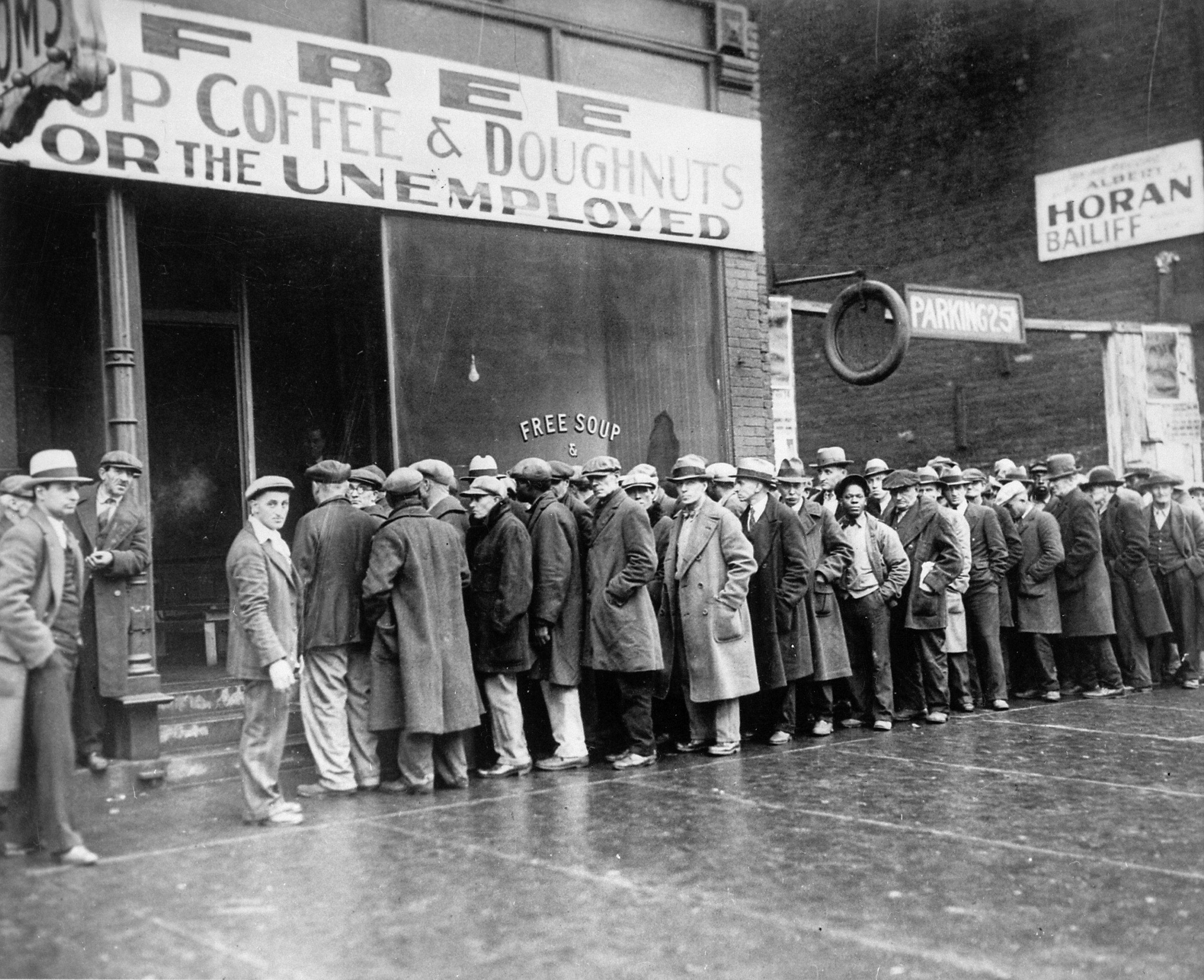
Unemployed men queued outside a depression-era soup kitchen in Chicago 1931

A handout refers to something that is given or distributed freely, usually to those in need. It often refers to government welfare or a charitable gift, and it may take the form of money, food, or other necessities.

During the Great Depression, many people lived entirely on handouts of one kind or another when they could not afford to buy food. The term became especially popular among hobos, who developed a system of signs and symbols to describe the nature, quantity, and availability of handouts.

The term "handout" is used specifically in sociology and welfare analysis to identify direct payments or provision of goods, and to distinguish them from other forms of welfare support such as low-interest loans, subsidized housing, or medical care. However, some people feel it has a negative connotation, with the implication that a handout is unearned and undeserved. "Give a hand up, not a handout" is a common remark among of workfare or other welfare-to-work systems. Another dichotomy characterization is "to be lifted up by a rope" vs stepping up onto a "ladder of opportunity". A well-known saying along this line is "Give a man a fish and you feed him for a day. Teach a man to fish and you feed him for a lifetime". The term "government handout" is often applied to both welfare systems as well as corporate welfare or pork. The biography of Star Parker (disclosed in detail in her books) is of a person who has lived on both sides of the dichotomy.

== See also ==
- Alms
- Common good
