= Knower (disambiguation) =

Knower is an American independent electronic music duo.

Knower may also refer to:

- Benjamin Knower (1775–1839), American merchant, banker, and politician
- "The Knower", a song by Youth Lagoon from Savage Hills Ballroom

== See also ==
- Knower House, historic home in Albany County, New York
- Knower paradox
- Knowledge (disambiguation)
