= Common =

Common may refer to:

As an Irish surname, it is anglicised from Irish Gaelic surname Ó Comáin.

== Places ==
- Common, a townland in County Tyrone, Northern Ireland
- Boston Common, a central public park in Boston, Massachusetts
- Cambridge Common, common land area in Cambridge, Massachusetts
- Clapham Common, originally common land, now a park in London, UK
- Common Moss, a townland in County Tyrone, Northern Ireland
- Lexington Common, a common land area in Lexington, Massachusetts
- Salem Common Historic District, a common land area in Salem, Massachusetts

== People ==
- Common (rapper) (born 1972), American hip hop artist, actor, and poet
- Andrew Ainslie Common (1841–1903), English amateur astronomer
- Andrew Common (1889–1953), British shipping director
- John Common, American songwriter, musician and singer
- Thomas Common (1850–1919), Scottish translator and literary critic

== Arts, entertainment, and media ==
- Common (film), a 2014 BBC One film, written by Jimmy McGovern, on the UK's Joint Enterprise Law
- Dol Common, a character in The Alchemist by Ben Jonson
- Harvard Common Press of Boston, Massachusetts, a publisher of cookbooks and parenting books
- The Common Room, a former interactive TV show on ITV Play
- "Common" (song), a song by Maren Morris from Girl
- ”Common”, a song by Zayn from his 2018 album Icarus Falls

== Religion ==
- Common (liturgy), a part of certain Christian liturgy
- Common, translation of tum'ah, a biblical term for ritual impurity, used by some common English translations of the bible

== Science and technology ==
- COMMON (user group), the largest association of users of mid-range IBM computers
- COMMON, a Fortran statement
- Common or vernacular, the layman's but not scientific name of a plant or animal

== Other uses ==
- Common (behavior), vulgar behavior or attitude of a common person
- Common (company), an American coliving company founded in 2015
- Common (horse), a British thoroughbred racehorse
- Common Application, an undergraduate college admission application
- Common land or town common, land on which multiple entities share certain traditional rights, such as grazing livestock or collecting firewood
- Common language, also known as lingua franca, a language shared by speakers of different mother tongues
- Common Room (university) or combination room, organized groups of students and the academic body that provide representation in the organisation of college or dormitory life, to operate certain services within these institutions such as laundry or recreation, and to provide opportunities for socialising
- Common room, shared space in a building
- Common (script), name for generic script characters, ISO code Zyyy

== See also ==
- Common Good (disambiguation)
- Common knowledge (disambiguation)
- Commoner (disambiguation)
- Commons (disambiguation)
- The Common (disambiguation)
