= Commonweal =

Commonweal or common weal may refer to:

- Common good, what is shared and beneficial for members of a given community
- Common Weal, a Scottish think tank and advocacy group
- Commonweal (magazine), an American lay-Catholic-oriented magazine (1924–present)
- Commonweal (newspaper), a British socialist newspaper (1885–1894)
- Commonwealth, a form of government without a monarch in which people have governmental influence

== See also ==
- League of the Public Weal, a French feudal alliance in the 15th century
- Mad War (or War of the Public Weal), a 15th-century conflict between feudal lords and the French monarchy
- Commonweal Lodge
- Commonweal Party, an Indian political party that existed in Tamil Nadu between 1951 and 1954
- Commonweal School, in Swindon, Wiltshire, England.
- Commonweal Theatre Company, a professional, live theatre company in Lanesboro, Minnesota, United States
- Common Good (disambiguation)
- Commonwealth (disambiguation)
