= Common knowledge (disambiguation) =

Common knowledge is knowledge which is known to be true, and knowledge which most people know.

Common knowledge may also refer to:

- Common knowledge (logic), a logical concept
- Common Knowledge (game show), an American television game show hosted by Joey Fatone
- Common Knowledge?, a 2014 book by Dariusz Jemielniak
- "Common Knowledge", a Series C episode of the television series QI (2005)

== See also ==
- Common (disambiguation)
- Knowledge (disambiguation)
