= Everywoman (disambiguation) =

An everywoman is a stock character in drama; an ordinary individual, with whom the audience is able to easily identify.

Everywoman may also refer to:

- Everywoman (film), a 1919 lost film
- everywoman (organisation), a women's professional organization
- Everywoman (radio programme), a radio programme

== See also ==
- Everyman (disambiguation)
