= Everyman (disambiguation) =

Everyman is a stock character in drama, originally appearing in mediaeval morality plays.

Everyman may also refer to:

== Literature ==
=== Drama ===
- Everyman (15th-century play), a 15th-century English medieval play
  - Everyman (1901 play), a 1902 Broadway production based on the 15th-century medieval morality play
  - Everybody (play), a 2017 adaptation by Branden Jacobs-Jenkins
  - Everyman (1964 film), an Australian television adaptation
- Elckerlijc, a 1495 Dutch morality play attributed to Peter van Diest, a possible model for the English play
  - Elckerlyc (film), a 1975 loose adaptation of the play
- Jedermann (play), a 1911 adaptation by Hugo von Hofmannsthal
  - Everyman (Sibelius), a 1916 incidental music by Jean Sibelius to the Hofmannsthal play
  - The Play of Everyman (1917), a George Sterling’s adaptation of Hofmannsthal’s version
  - Sechs Monologe aus Jedermann (Six monologues from Jedermann, 1943–44)), songs by Frank Martin
  - Jedermann (film), a 1961 film based on the Hofmannsthal play

=== Books and magazines ===
- Everyman (novel), a 2006 novel by Philip Roth
- Everyman's Library, a series of reprinted classic literature
- Everyman (magazine), an English magazine published from 1929 to 1935

=== Comic books ===
- Everyman (DC Comics), a shapeshifting member of Lex Luthor's Infinity Inc
- Everyman (Marvel Comics), a Marvel Comics super villain (Larry Eckler)
- Everyman (The Simpsons), a character created by Comic Book Guy

== Companies and organizations ==
=== Cinemas and theaters ===
- Everyman Cinemas, a chain of cinemas across London, Leeds, Surrey, and Hampshire.
- Everyman Palace Theatre, a theatre in Cork, Ireland
- Everyman Theatre, Cheltenham, a theatre in Cheltenham, England
- Everyman Theatre, Liverpool, a theatre in Liverpool, England
- Everyman Theatre, Baltimore, a theater in Baltimore, Maryland

=== Others ===
- Everyman Chess, a publisher of chess books
- Everyman Films Limited, the production company of Patrick McGoohan and David Tomblin
- Everyman's Welfare Service (also known as "Everyman's"), Australian parachurch organization

== Other ==
- Everyman (TV series), a BBC television documentary series concerned with moral and religious issues
- "Every Man", a song by the Christian band Casting Crowns
- Everyman Campaign, a charity set up to research and raise awareness testicular and prostate cancer
- Everyman, a logo element of PBS, see PBS § Visual identity
- "Everyman (Has to Carry His Own Weight)", a 1976 single by the American disco group Double Exposure

== See also ==
- Everyman
- Everywoman (disambiguation)
- Average Joe
- Common man (disambiguation)
- Commoner (disambiguation)
- John Doe (disambiguation)
- John Q. Public
- Straight man (disambiguation)
- Zé Povinho, Portuguese everyman
