= Brochure =

Flyer, pamphlet, or leaflet that is used to pass information about something

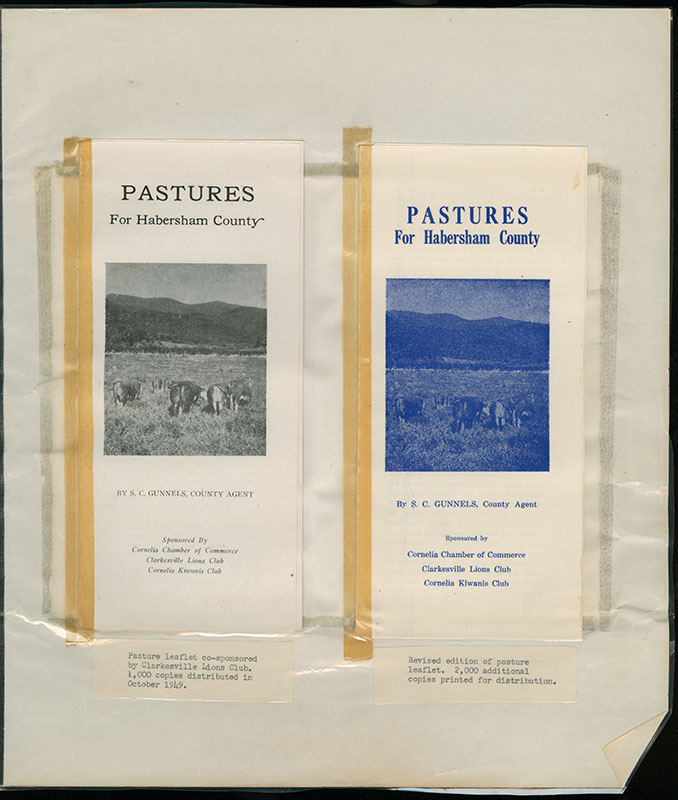
"Pastures for Habersham County" brochures by S.C. Gunnels, the county agent.

A brochure is a promotional document used to introduce an organization, product, service, or event to prospective audiences. Traditionally produced as a folded paper piece (e.g., pamphlet or leaflet), brochures may also be distributed in digital formats.

Brochures are distributed through personal handouts, direct mail, inserts in newspapers or folders, and displays in brochure racks at high-traffic sites, especially in tourist areas. Although often used as a corporate marketing tool to promote products or services, brochures may also be classified as grey literature.

== Description ==
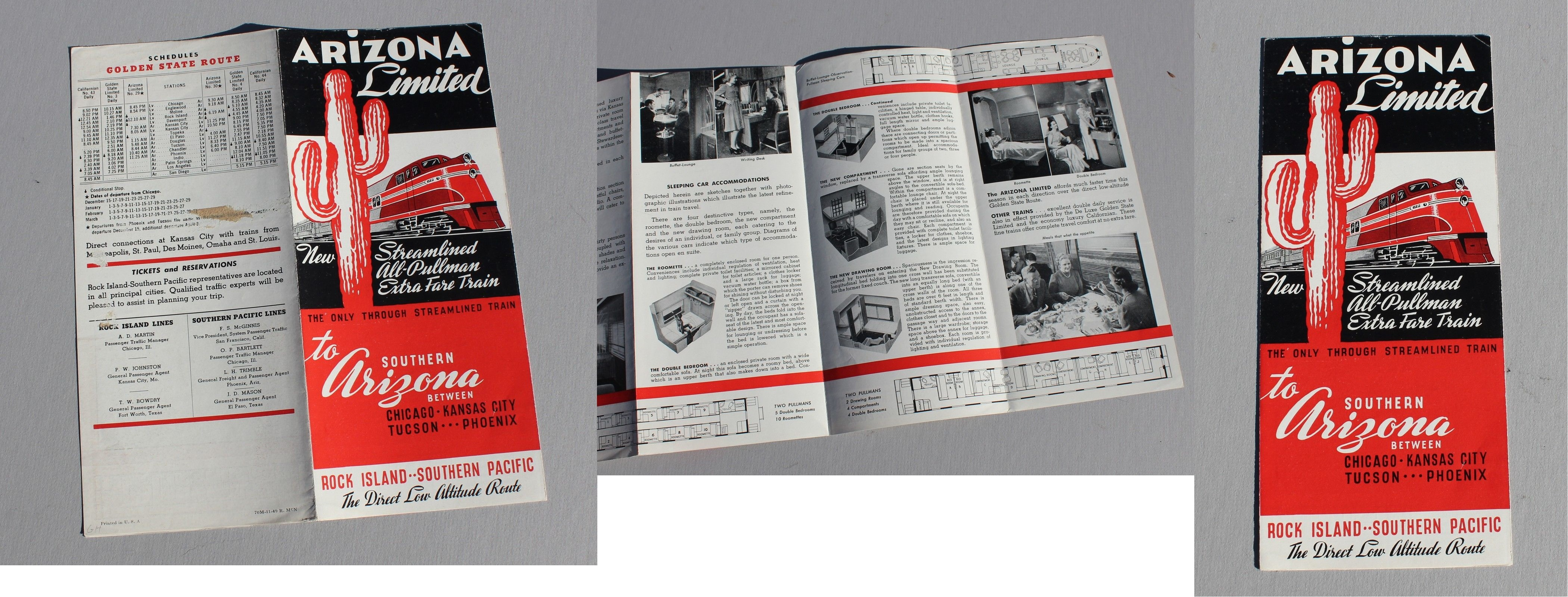
A 1940s brochure advertising the train, Arizona Limited

A brochure is typically a multi-panel (folded) printed piece that presents summary promotional information. This format distinguishes brochures from rack cards, which are single, unfolded sheets often printed on both sides for display in literature racks. A booklet typically comprises several sheets with a card stock cover and is bound with staples, string, or plastic binding. By contrast, other single, unfolded pieces are commonly termed inserts, flyers, or bulletins. Due to their format, brochures generally possess a longer shelf life than other printed marketing materials, often remaining in circulation for one or more years.

== Varieties ==
1: letter (C) tri-fold; 2: gatefold; 3: roll/double gatefold; 4: accordion (Z) fold; 5: double (parallel) fold; 6: double right-angle (French) fold

Single-sheet brochures are produced from one printed sheet that is folded to create panels. Common folds include:

- Bi-fold — the sheet is folded once to create four panels (two per side).
- Tri-fold (letter/C-fold) — the sheet is folded into thirds to create six panels.
- Gatefold — the two outer panels fold inward to meet at the center, creating a “gate”-like opening.
- Roll fold / double gatefold — panels roll inward; in a double gatefold the outer panels fold to the center and then the whole piece folds again, allowing expansive interior spreads.
- Accordion (Z) fold — panels fold back and forth in a zig-zag, useful for step-by-step or sequential content.
- Double (parallel) fold — the sheet is folded in half and then folded again in the same direction, producing eight narrow panels.
- Double right-angle (French) fold — the sheet is folded in half and then again at a right angle; common for maps and posters.

Larger sheets (for detailed maps or photo spreads) are often folded using the right-angle or parallel methods to yield four, six, or more panels.

Booklet brochures are made from multiple sheets assembled as a small book, most often saddle-stitched (stapled through the fold) or perfect bound like a paperback, and result in eight or more pages.

Brochures distributed in electronic formats are commonly called e-brochures.

== Printing ==
Brochures are commonly printed in full color using the four-color (CMYK) process on coated text or cover stocks to reproduce photographs and saturated colors cleanly. Coatings and finishes (e.g., gloss, satin/matte, or an aqueous coating) may be specified to adjust sheen and durability.

For short runs or quick turnaround, digital presses are often used. For larger runs, offset printing generally achieves a lower cost per unit once the higher up-front set-up cost is spread across a large run.

== Marketing brochure ==
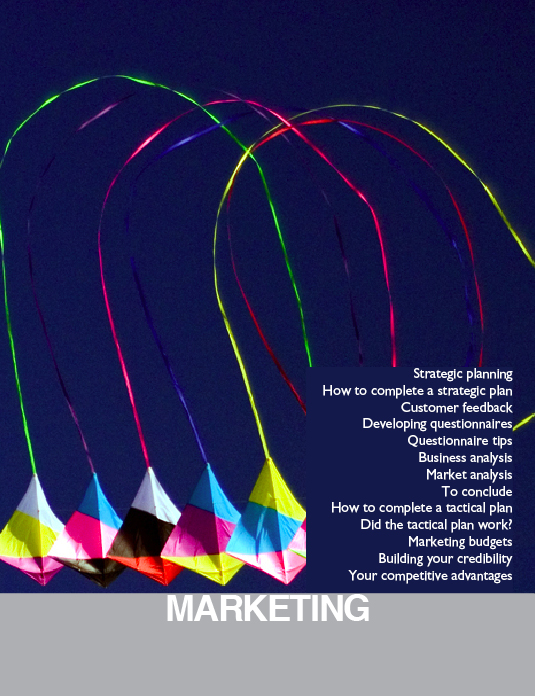
Booklet cover in style of marketing brochures: summarizes main issues being taught.

The term "marketing brochure" refers to a small document, or pamphlet, which describes and promotes various products or services to be marketed. Some companies have developed computer printing software to generate marketing brochures, which might be available for use at a public library. However, it is common for a company to have a marketing brochure prepared by a commercial printing company or department that has experience in creating (or designing) such documents. As compared to a flyer or a handbill, a printed brochure usually has higher-quality paper and more color and is folded or stapled at the seam.

Because the goal of a marketing brochure is typically to assist in the sales or distribution of products and services, the wording in the brochure is often very positive, with "glowing terms" to describe the features and benefits being offered. It is unlikely for a marketing brochure to list major complaints customers have stated about the products to avoid any negative aspects of those products or services. Instead, the focus is typically on persuasion to encourage people to obtain the items described in the brochure.

The term "marketing brochure" dates back many decades, such as for advertising new automobile features of the 1955 Ford Thunderbird.

== See also ==
- Printed matter
- Marketing collateral
- Executive summary
- Factsheet
- Propaganda
