= An Ordinary Man (disambiguation) =

An Ordinary Man may refer to:

== Film ==
- Un om obisnuit, a 1960 Romanian documentary short
- Um Homem Qualquer, a 2009 Brazilian film released in English as An Ordinary Man
- An Ordinary Man (2012 film)
- An Ordinary Man, a 2017 film starring Ben Kingsley

== Music ==
- An Ordinary Man (musician), an electronic musician
- An Ordinary Man (The Niro album) (2008)
- An Ordinary Man (Neil Lockwood album) (2008)

== Books ==
- An Ordinary Man (book), the 2006 autobiography of Paul Rusesabagina

== See also ==
- Ordinary Man (disambiguation)
