= Civil law =

Civil law may refer to:

- Civil law (common law), the part of law that concerns private citizens and legal persons
- Civil law (legal system), or continental law, a legal system originating in continental Europe and based on Roman law
  - Private law, the branch of law in a civil law legal system that concerns relations among private individuals

== See also ==
- Civil code
- Civil (disambiguation)
- Ius civile, Latin for "civil law"
- Common law (disambiguation)
- Criminal law
