= Commons (disambiguation) =

Commons is a general term for shared resources, typically used in political economic theory.

As an Irish surname, it is anglicised from Irish Gaelic surname Ó Comáin.

Commons may also refer to:

== Shared resources ==
- Common good (disambiguation)
- Common land, shared areas of land; has a specific legal meaning in the British Isles
- Global commons, term used for international commons in political economic theory

== Computing and Internet ==
- Apache Commons, repository of reusable Java programming language components
- Commons (news website), Taiwan-based Hong Kong news website established in 2021
- Creative Commons, licensing system for creative works
- Digital commons (economics), a form of commons involving the distribution and communal ownership of informational resources and technology
- Digital Commons (Elsevier), a commercial, hosted institutional repository platform owned by RELX Group
- Wikimedia Commons, a project of the Wikimedia Foundation that serves as an online repository of images, sound, and other media files

== Places ==
=== Electoral districts ===
- Commons (ward), Christchurch, England

=== Northern Ireland townlands ===
- Commons, County Down, in the List of townlands in County Down
- Commons, County Fermanagh, in the List of townlands in County Fermanagh
- Commons, County Tyrone, in the List of townlands in County Tyrone

=== Shopping centers ===
- Algonquin Commons, a large outdoor shopping center in Algonquin, Illinois, US, often referred to as "the Commons"
- Ithaca Commons, a shopping street in Ithaca, New York, US

== People ==
- John R. Commons (1862–1945), economist and labour historian
- Jamie N Commons (born 1988), British singer and songwriter
- Kim Commons (1951–2015), American chess master
- Kris Commons (born 1983), Scottish footballer
- Michael Commons (born 1939), American scientist

== Media ==
- Commons: Journal of Social Criticism, a left-wing Ukrainian magazine
- Commmons, a Japanese record label
- The Commons (TV series), a 2020 Australian series on Stan

== Political parties ==
- Comunes (Chile)
- Commons (Colombian political party)

== Other uses ==
- House of Commons, the elected lower houses of the parliaments of the United Kingdom and Canada, colloquially referred to as "the Commons"
  - House of Commons of Canada
  - House of Commons of the United Kingdom
- Commons, a concurrency road or other place where multiple roadways share pavement

== See also ==
- Common (disambiguation)
- Common good (disambiguation)
- Commoner (disambiguation)
- The Common (disambiguation)
- Commonlands, an area in the game EverQuest 1 and 2
