= The Great Commoner =

The Great Commoner has referred to several individuals:

- William Pitt the Elder, British Prime Minister, before he accepted a title as the Earl of Chatham
- William Jennings Bryan, American presidential candidate
- Winston Churchill, British Prime Minister
- Abraham Lincoln, 16th President of the United States
- Rutherford B. Hayes, 19th President of the United States
- Hara Takashi, 10th Prime Minister of Japan, popularly called "The great commoner premier"
- James Z. George, American lawyer, writer, and politician and Confederate politician and military officer called Mississippi's 'Great Commoner"
- Thaddeus Stevens, American politician
- Leon Abbett, American politician, and 26th governor of New Jersey
