= The Knowledge (mural) =

Mural in Portland, Oregon

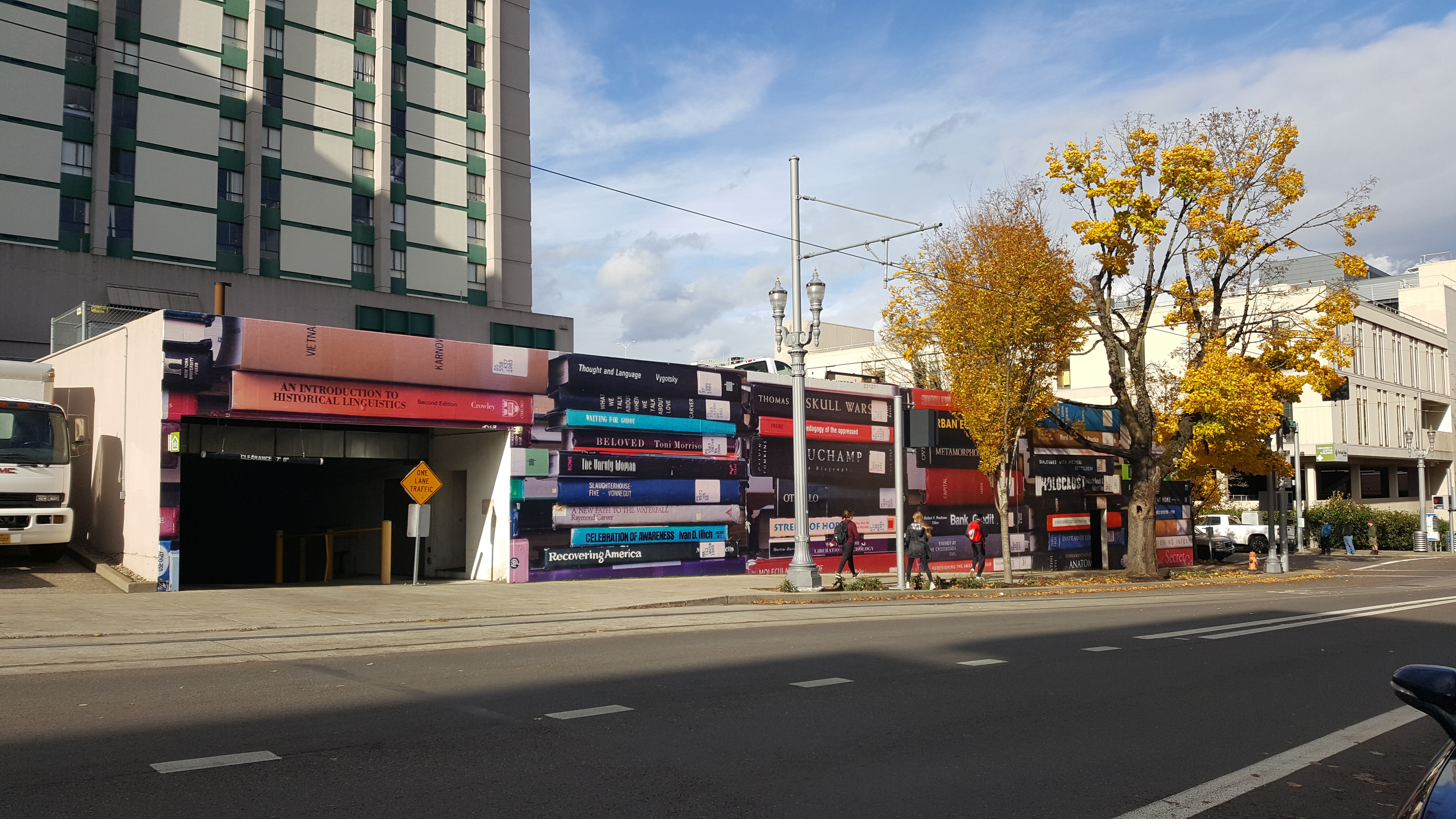
- The mural in 2017
- Artist: Harrell Fletcher; Avalon Kalin
- Year: 2010
- Type: Mural
- Location: Portland, Oregon, United States; 45.50997°N 122.68250°W

The Knowledge is a 2010 mural by Harrell Fletcher and Avalon Kalin, installed on the Portland State University campus in Portland, Oregon, in the United States.

== Description ==
The Knowledge is a mural depicting books from Portland State University's (PSU) Branford Price Millar Library, installed along Southwest Fifth Avenue between Hall and College streets on the campus. According to PSU, the book titles "reflect education and sustainability efforts" and were selected by students, faculty, and staff.

The artist wrote on his official website:

This was a percent for art public art project located on a large blank wall at the corner of SW 5th and Hall on the Portland State University campus. I worked with Avalon Kalin on the project and we contacted as many people on the PSU campus–students, faculty, staff, and asked them to recommend a book that they used in their teaching or studies that was available in the PSU library. We then pulled those books off the selves, stacked them up and had them photographed by Motoya Nakamura. The photo was then enlarged by a billboard company and attached to the wall. A plaque is included with all of the names of the people who participated in the project.

== See also ==
- 2010 in art
