= The Know =

The Know may refer to:

- The Know (TV program), an Australian television talk show
- The Know, an entertainment news division of Rooster Teeth
- The Know (Portland, Oregon), a bar in the United States
- The Know, a 2003 novel by Martina Cole
- Know (album), a 2018 album by American singer-songwriter Jason Mraz
- The Know (band), a Los Angeles-based band
