= Who Knows =

Who Knows may refer to:

- 'Who Knows? (video), a DVD by Andrew W.K.
- Who Knows? (film) (Va savoir), a 2001 French romantic comedy-drama
- Who Knows? (game show), a 1959 Canadian television panel game quiz show
- "Who Knows" (song), by Daniel Caesar
- "Who Knows", a song by Avril Lavigne from Under My Skin
- "Who Knows", a song by Natasha Bedingfield from N.B.
- "Who Knows", a song by Jimi Hendrix from Band of Gypsys
- "Who Knows?", a short story by Guy de Maupassant, published in 1890

== See also ==
- "Who Knows Who", a collaborative song by Muse and The Streets
