= Straight man (disambiguation) =

A straight man is a stock character in a comedy performance, especially a double act, sketch comedy, or farce.

Straight man may also refer to:

- A heterosexual man
- Straight Man, a 1997 novel by Richard Russo

== See also ==
- Gay man, a homosexual man
