= Common Good =

Common good is a political and philosophical concept.

Common Good may also refer to:

== Organisations ==
- Italy. Common Good (Italia. Bene Comune), a political coalition in Italy
- The Common Good (political party), a political party in the United Kingdom

== Other ==
- Common good (economics), goods which are rivalrous and non-excludable
- Common Good Fund, a fund to benefit the people of a former burgh in Scotland
- Economy for the Common Good, a social movement advocating for an alternative economic model
- The Common Good, a Christian talk radio show

== See also ==
- Maslaha, the corresponding concept in Islamic law
- Common (disambiguation)
- Commons (disambiguation)
- Commonweal (disambiguation)
- Commonwealth (disambiguation)
