= Common law (disambiguation) =

Common law is a legal system named after judge-made law, which plays an important role in it.

Common law may also refer to:

- Common-law marriage, a relationship in which a couple lives together
- Jus commune, a type of broad, underlying law
- The Common Law (Holmes), an 1881 book by Oliver Wendell Holmes, Jr.
- The Common Law, a 1911 novel written by Robert W. Chambers, and its film adaptations:
  - The Common Law (1916 film), an American silent drama film
  - The Common Law (1923 film), a lost film
  - The Common Law (1931 film), an American film starring Constance Bennett and Joel McCrea
- Common Law (1996 TV series), a United States sitcom by ABC
- Common Law (2012 TV series), a United States comedy-drama by the USA Network

== See also ==
- Civil law (disambiguation)
- Civil code
- Criminal law
- Common Rule
- Common rule awards
