= Ordinary People: Our Story =

2003 Osbourne family memoir

- Publisher: Simon & Schuster
- Publication date: December 2003

Ordinary People: Our Story is a collaborative memoir of the Osbourne family, in collaboration with Todd Gold. It features interviews with Ozzy Osbourne and Sharon Osbourne, both credited as co-authors, as well as their children Aimee Osbourne, Kelly Osbourne, and Jack Osbourne. It was published by Simon & Schuster in December 2003. The book details the family members' personal histories through anecdotes covering a variety of topics, including Ozzy and Sharon's early lives and struggles, Jack and Kelly's forays into the entertainment industry, and the success of The Osbournes.

Reviews of the book were mixed, with most agreeing that Ozzy's early life was the most interesting portion of the book. The Mirror described it as "lively, honest and good value." The Buffalo News called it "the epitome of a fans-only purchase."
