= BBC Knowledge (magazine) =

Defunct magazine covering science, nature and history

- Categories: Science and technology
- Frequency: Bi-monthly (6 per year)
- First issue: 2008; 17 years ago
- Final issue: November 2012; 12 years ago
- Company: BBC Magazines
- Country: United Kingdom
- Website: bbcknowledge.org

BBC Knowledge Magazine was a magazine covering science, nature and history which was launched in 2008 and ceased publication in November 2012.

The magazine's now-defunct website described it thus:

BBC Knowledge Magazine - the new magazine about science, nature and history...invention, innovation and more. Sir Francis Bacon was right about knowledge. It is power. Ben Franklin agreed, "An investment in knowledge always pays the best interest."

BBC Knowledge Magazine was unrelated to the television channels BBC Knowledge and BBC Knowledge (international).

The magazine was chosen as one of the top ten magazines launched in 2008 by Library Journal.

BBC Knowledge Magazine reprinted articles from BBC Focus, BBC History and BBC Wildlife.
