= John Common =

American singer-songwriter

John Common is an American songwriter, musician and singer based in Denver, Colorado, United States.

Born in Jacksonville, North Carolina, Common spent most of his youth in Pensacola, Florida. When he was thirteen years old, Common found his older brother's Epiphone acoustic guitar in a closet and began writing songs. While in Pensacola, Common founded and fronted the psychedelic roots rock band Bunkhouse Jones. Featuring drummer Matthew Baranowski, guitarists Aaron Monte and Richard Abercrombie, Bunkhouse Jones released two records and toured clubs and small venues in the South. After finishing school, he traveled around the country to New York City, Boston, Atlanta, Burlington, and other towns writing, busking, playing shows and making lo-fi recordings. After a stint working on a small family farm in Denmark, Kansas, he made his way to Colorado.

As the singer, songwriter and guitarist for the Denver-based roots rock/alt-country band Rainville, he built a reputation for writing gritty, honest songs. Rainville released two albums to critical acclaim nationally and in Europe, and toured from 1999 to 2004.

Common began exploring different musical and lyrical territory in 2005. This new creative direction surfaced on Good To Be Born and Why Birds Fly – the first two records released under his name on Free School Records in 2006 and 2007 respectively. Those two records established Common in the Denver music scene as an independent artist and songwriter.

He continued to evolve his sound by releasing a record entitled Beautiful Empty under the name John Common and Blinding Flashes of Light in 2011. That full length was quickly followed by an EP named Side 3. Common's band, Blinding Flashes of Light, was a large collective of musicians, artists and friends drawn from Denver's indie music scene. They toured across the United States multiple times in support of Beautiful Empty and Side 3. The musical collective evolved into John Common Superheart in 2014, and in 2015 Common released an EP named Two Rivers, again on Free School Records. Two Rivers was co-produced by John Common and Steve Vidaic. John Common Superheart tracked a full length record with Steve Vidaic as co-producer and engineer that hasn't been released yet.

In 2017, Common began exploring a more stripped down direction and returned to playing and recording under his name. The current musical configuration features John Common on vocals, guitars and keys, Jess DeNicola on backing vocals, and Joe Mazza on guitars and sounds. They released the first single named Make It Real in December 2019. Make It Real is from a new EP that will be serially released in early 2019. This same group has also tracked another full length record that they will complete and release in 2020.

== Discography ==
- Make It Real (Single) - 2019
- Two Rivers (EP) - 2015
- Side 3 (EP) - 2011
- Beautiful Empty - 2011
- Spill (EP) - 2007
- Why Birds Fly - 2007
- Good To Be Born - 2006
- The Longest Street In America (Rainville) - 2003
- Collecting Empties (Rainville) - 1999

== Awards ==
- 2015 Westword Icon
- 2014 Westword Nominated Best Singer/Songwriter
- 2013 Westword Nominated Best Singer/Songwriter
- 2012 Westword Nominated Best Indie Folk Band
- 2011 Westword Nominated Best Singer/Songwriter
- 2010 Top 20 Albums (Beautiful Empty) – Colorado Music and Radio
- 2010 Mover and Shaker – Westword
- 2010 Denver Post Top 20 Underground Bands
- 2010 Westword Best Indie Folk/Acoustic Artist
- 2009 Westword Nominated Best Pop Artist
- 2009 Denver Music Scene Top 10 Songwriters
- 2008 Independent Music Awards Vox Pop winner for College Record Label "From These Words".
- 2008 Telluride Bluegrass Festival Troubadour Finalist
- 2008 Westword Nominated Best Singer/Songwriter
- 2007 Lyons Folks Festival Finalist
- 2007 Mover and Shaker / Best Local Release – Westword
- 2007 Best Local Release – The Denver Post
- 2006 Most Intriguing Discs – The Onion
- 2006 Westword Nominated Best Singer/Songwriter
- 2006 Westword Best Guitar Tone

== Collaborative projects ==
- People's Kazoo Orchestra
- Common Box Project
- Beautiful Empty Film Conspiracy
- Tom Waits Rain Dogs Tribute
- Blinding Flashes of Light
