= Marketing collateral =

Collection of media to support the sales of a product or service

In marketing and sales, marketing collateral is a collection of media used to support the sales of a product or service. Historically, the term "collateral" specifically referred to brochures or sell sheets developed as sales support tools. These sales aids are intended to make the sales effort easier and more effective.

Companies present their brand through marketing collateral, which reinforces a consistent message across various media, and must balance informative, promotional, and entertaining content.

== Common examples ==
There are many items that come under marketing collateral, some common items are:

=== Sales brochures and other printed product information ===
These are print materials that summarize a product's or service's main features and benefits and include a persuasive call to action. They are often distributed to potential customers through direct mail, trade shows, or sales representatives. They aim to increase awareness and adoption of the product or service by providing relevant and concise information.

=== Visual aids used in sales presentations ===
These are visual elements that complement a verbal sales pitch and help to illustrate and reinforce the key points and arguments. They can be in the form of graphics, charts, tables, images, videos, or animations. They are often displayed on a screen, a board, or a handout. They aim to enhance the effectiveness and memorability of the sales presentation by showing data, comparisons, benefits, features, testimonials, etc.

=== Web content ===
This is any content that is published on a website or other online platforms, such as blogs, social media, or email newsletters. It can be in the form of text, images, videos, audio, or interactive features. It is often optimized for search engines, lead generation, and conversion. It aims to attract and educate the online audience and persuade them to take a desired action, such as buying, subscribing, or contacting.

=== Sales scripts ===
These are written guides that outline the steps and techniques for conducting a sales conversation with a prospect or customer. They usually include an introduction, a qualification, a presentation, an objection handling, and a closing. They are often used by sales representatives over the phone or in person. They aim to establish rapport, identify needs, offer solutions, overcome objections, and close the deal.

=== Demonstration scripts ===
These are written guides that outline the steps and techniques for conducting a sales demonstration of a product or service. They usually include an introduction, a demonstration, a summary, and a call to action. They are often used by sales representatives in person or online. They aim to highlight features, benefits, and value propositions, address pain points and challenges, and create urgency and desire.

=== Product data sheets ===
These are technical documents that provide detailed information about the specifications, features, functions, performance, compatibility, etc. of a product. They usually include tables, diagrams, charts, or graphs to illustrate the data. They are often used by engineers, technicians, or other experts who need to evaluate or compare the product. They aim to educate the audience about the product’s capabilities and advantages.

=== Product white papers ===
These are authoritative and informative documents that provide in-depth insights into a specific topic related to a product or industry. They usually include data, facts, statistics, case studies, or research findings to support the arguments. They are often used by decision-makers, influencers, or researchers who need to understand or solve a problem or opportunity. They aim to educate the audience about the topic.

=== Promotional pictures ===
These are images that showcase a product or service in an attractive and appealing way. They usually include high-quality photos or illustrations of the product or service in use or in context. They can be used to capture the target audience’s attention and emotion, convey brand personality and message, and increase interest and desire.

== See also ==
- Enterprise content management
- Content creation
