= Aam Aadmi =

Hindustani colloquial expression

Aam Aadmi (Hindi: आम आदमी, Urdu: عام آدمی) — literal translation: "ordinary man" (ām meaning ordinary + ādmī meaning man) — is a Hindustani colloquial expression and the equivalent of "the Average Joe."

The Indian National Congress based its 2004 election campaign on the aam aadmi theme. The party's slogan for the election was Congress ka Haath, Aam Aadmi ke Saath ("the hand of the Congress is with the common man"). In 2007, the Congress launched its Aam Aadmi Ka Sipahi ("the Common Man's Soldier") campaign to popularize the programmes of its UPA government.

The expression was also adopted by the Aam Aadmi Party, formed in 2012. At that time, the Congress objected to the newly formed party's name, claiming that the aam aadmi has been synonymous with the Congress since 1885.

"Mango man" is an absurd translation of the phrase (aam is also the Hindi word for "mango"). In 2012, Robert Vadra was criticized by activists, when he mocked them as "mango men in banana republic".

In 2014, the new prime minister Narendra Modi directed that Air India change its long-standing Maharaja logo for one utilising aam aadmi.

== See also ==
- List of terms referring to an average person
