= Presentation folder =

A presentation folder is a kind of folder that holds loose papers or documents together for organization and protection. Historically, two of the biggest end markets for presentation folders have been marketing, where they may be used as proposal covers or media kits, or in education. Presentation folders usually consist of a sheet of heavy paper stock or other thin, but stiff, material which is folded in half with pockets in order to keep paper documents. Presentation folders function much like that of a file folder for organizational purposes. They can be either printed or plain and can be used, amongst other things, as a tool for business presentations to customers to aid in the sales process.

== Uses of presentation folders ==
Presentation folders come in many different styles to suit a variety of purposes. Most all are produced by a company to provide marketing for a product (business) and/or service, but they can fulfil other functions. A few examples would be a company producing a new product and wanted to show their customers all the benefits of that product in an organized fashion, or folders used to organise documents for distribution to delegates at a conference.

Some types of presentation folders:

- Standard 9" x 12" two-pocket
- Tri-fold or Tri-panel
- Capacity (usually with a 1/4"+ spine to hold more)
- Tabbed (for use in hanging files or filing cabinets)
- Mini or small
- Green or Eco-friendly

Examples

More printed presentation folders for various businesses

Folders with spines for holding extra documents

Eco-friendly printed folders

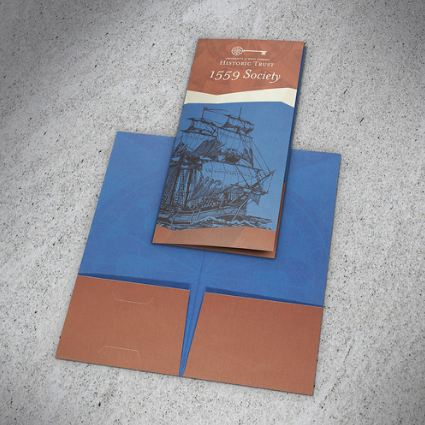
A 4x9 brochure presentation folder

== See also ==
- Manila folder
- File folder
- Ring binder
