= Citizen X (disambiguation) =

Citizen X is a 1995 American television film.

Citizen X may also refer to:

- Citizen X, a 2002 video game developed by Digital Pictures
- Kane (wrestler), WWE wrestler and mayor of Knox County also known as Citizen X
- Citizen X (character), a member of the new Crusaders (D.C. comics) created by S.H.A.D.E.
- CitizenX, a Swiss company

== See also ==
- Citizen V, a codename for several Marvel comic book characters
- Citizen AA, a sports club in Hong Kong First Division League
- "The Unknown Citizen", a 1939 poem written by W. H. Auden
- Organization X, a fighting force and resistance organization in Greece
- Party X, a political party in Poland
- X Party, a political party in Spain
- Comrade X, a 1940 American film
- Comrade (disambiguation)
- Citizen (disambiguation)
- The Citizen (disambiguation)
- Good Citizen (disambiguation)
- Mr. Citizen (disambiguation)
- Citizen Dog (disambiguation)
- Citizen Force (disambiguation)
- Citizen Soldier (disambiguation)
- Citizen of Paris (disambiguation)
- Mobile Citizen (disambiguation)
- Non-citizen (disambiguation)
- X (disambiguation)
- Doctor X (disambiguation)
- Professor X (disambiguation)
- Lady X (disambiguation)
- Madame X (disambiguation)
- Miss X (disambiguation)
- Mister X (disambiguation)
- Jane Doe (disambiguation)
- Citizen Jane (disambiguation)
- Citizen Joe, a 2005 Stargate SG-1 episode
- John Doe (disambiguation)
- Joe Public (disambiguation)
- John Q. Citizen (or John Q. Public), a generic name in the United States used to denote a hypothetical member of society deemed a "common man" or "man on the street"
- Plebs, the general body of free ancient Roman citizens
- Average Joe, a common North American term to refer to a completely average person
- Joe Bloggs, a commonly used fictional name in British English
- Joe Shmoe, a commonly used fictional name in American English
- J. Random X, types of "random" (meaning "arbitrary") categories of people in computer lore
- Man on the street, short interviews with members of the public
  - T.C. Mits (acronym for "the celebrated man in the street"), a term coined by Lillian Rosanoff Lieber to refer to an everyman
- Reasonable person, a hypothetical person of legal fiction
  - The man on the Clapham omnibus, a hypothetical ordinary and reasonable person in English law
  - Man on the Bondi tram, an ordinary person used in civil law in New South Wales, Australia
- Placeholder name, words that can refer to objects or people whose names are temporarily forgotten, irrelevant, or unknown
- Commoner (disambiguation)
- Everyman (disambiguation)
- The Masses (disambiguation)
- Tom, Dick, and Harry (disambiguation)
- Voice of the people (disambiguation)
- Vox populi (disambiguation)
- List of terms related to an average person
- Global citizenship, the idea that all people have rights and civic responsibilities that come with being a member of the world
