= John Doe (disambiguation) =

John Doe is a placeholder name for a party whose true identity is unknown or must be otherwise withheld.

John Doe may also refer to:

== Film, television, and radio ==
- John Doe (Neighbours), fictional character from the Australian soap opera Neighbours
- John Doe (Seven), a character from the film Seven
- John Doe (TV series), an American television show
- "John Doe" (Prison Break), a 2007 TV episode
- "John Doe" (Sleepy Hollow), a 2013 TV episode
- "John Doe" (The X-Files), a 2002 TV episode
- Meet John Doe, a 1941 comedy drama film
- John Doe, a character on the "Allen's Alley" segments of The Fred Allen Show
- John Doe: Vigilante, a 2014 Australian film

== Music ==
- "John Doe" (song), a 2013 song by American rapper B.o.B
- John Doe (musician) (born 1953), American singer, songwriter, actor, and poet
- Johndoe, Norwegian punk, rock and powerpop band
- "John Doe", a song by the American thrash metal band Testament on their album Demonic
- Songs for John Doe, the 1941 debut album of the Almanac Singers
- Jon Doe, British disc jockey and record producer
- "John Doe", a 2015 song by Wonder Girls from Reboot

== Comic ==
- John Doe, the first incarnation of the DC Comics supervillain Copperhead
- John Doe (comics), an Italian comic book
- John Doe, a main protagonist of webcomic unOrdinary

== Other uses ==
- American Homebuilts John Doe, an American aircraft design
- John Doe, the pseudonym of the anonymous whistleblower in the Panama Papers leak
- John Doe, a character in the video game Batman: The Enemy Within
- John Doe No. 24, later John Doe Boyd (died 1993), a deaf African-American man with uncertain identity who was institutionalized in Illinois for over 40 years

== See also ==
- Everyman (disambiguation)
- Citizen X (disambiguation)
- Commoner (disambiguation)
- Jane Doe (disambiguation)
- Ashok Kumar (disambiguation), placeholder name in India
- John Doak (disambiguation)
- Jon Dough (1962–2006), American pornographic actor
- John Dough, a gingerbread man brought to life in the Frank Baum book John Dough and the Cherub
- Joe Public (disambiguation)
- John Q. Public
- The Masses (disambiguation)
