= Man in the Street =

Man in the Street may refer to:

== Music ==
- "Man in the Street", a 1964 song written and performed by The Skatalites
- "Man in the Street", a song performed by The Hooters in the 1980s
- "Man in the Street", a song on the 1998 album Hell of a Tester by The Rasmus
- "Man in the Street", a song on the 1979 Rockers (soundtrack) album
- "The Man in the Street", original title of the 1951 Ronald Binge song "Elizabethan Serenade"

== Other uses ==
- Man on the street interview, or vox populi
- "Man in the Street", an episode of All in the Family 1970s TV series
- L'Homme dans la rue, a 1939 Maigret short story by Georges Simenon
- The Man in the Street (play), a 1947 play by Geoffrey Kerr

== See also ==
- List of terms referring to an average person
- Man on the Street (disambiguation)
- T.C. Mits, acronym for "the celebrated man in the street"
- John Doe (disambiguation)
- Everyman (disambiguation)
- Vox populi (disambiguation)
- "I'll Tell the Man in the Street", song in 1938 stage musical I Married An Angel
