= Citizen Jane =

Citizen Jane may refer to:

== Books ==
- Citizen Jane (book), a 1999 true-crime book by James Dalessandro
- Citizen Jane (biography), a 1990 biography of Jane Fonda by Christopher Andersen

== Films ==
- Citizen Jane (2009 film), a 2009 made-for-TV movie directed by Armand Mastroianni
- Citizen Jane (2017 film), a documentary about Jane Jacobs' activism against urban renewal

== Other ==
- "Citizen Jane", a 1987 song by Bernie Taupin from the album Tribe
- Citizen Jane Film Festival, an annual film festival at Stephens College

== See also ==
- Jane Citizen, a female version of John Q. Public
- Citizen Kane, a 1941 American film
- Citizen Joe, a 2005 Stargate SG-1 episode
- Citizen (disambiguation)
- Citizen X (disambiguation)
