= Aulus =

Aulus (abbreviated A.) is one of the small group of common forenames found in the culture of ancient Rome.

The name was traditionally connected with Latin aula, olla, "palace", but this is most likely a false etymology. Aulus in fact probably derives from Etruscan Avle, Avile, meaning "age/year" or "life".

Aulus may refer to:

- Aulus Agerius or Numerius Negidius (a name for the plaintiff in a lawsuit)
- Aulus Atilius Calatinus
- Aulus Avilius Flaccus
- Aulus Ofilius
- Aulus Caecina Alienus
- Aulus Caecina Severus (suffect consul 1 BC)
- Aulus Caecina Severus (writer)
- Aulus Cornelius Celsus
- Aulus Cornelius Cossus
- Aulus Cremutius Cordus
- Aulus Didius Gallus
- Aulus Didius Gallus Fabricius Veiento
- Aulus Gabinius
- Aulus Gellius
- Aulus Hirtius - consul after Caesar
- Aulus Licinius Archias
- Aulus Licinius Nerva Silianus
- Aulus Metellus or Aule Metele
- Aulus Paulinus - fictional governor of Britain in Chelmsford 123
- Aulus Persius Flaccus
- Aulus Platorius Nepos
- Aulus Plautius
- Aulus Terentius Varro Murena
- Aulus Vitellius
