= Numeri =

Numeri (Latin, 'numbers') may refer to:

- Book of Numbers, a book of the Hebrew Bible and the Torah
- Numeri (Roman troops), units of the Roman army

== See also ==
- Numeria gens
