= The Daily Citizen =

The Daily Citizen may refer to:

== United States newspapers ==
- Cushing Citizen, a daily newspaper in Cushing, Oklahoma
- Daily Citizen, a news site by Christian fundamentalist organization Focus on the Family
- The Daily Citizen (Iowa), a daily newspaper published in Iowa City, Iowa
- The Daily Citizen (Dalton), a daily newspaper in Dalton, Georgia
- The Daily Citizen (Searcy), a daily newspaper in Searcy, Arkansas
- Beaver Dam Daily Citizen, a daily newspaper by Lee Enterprises in Beaver Dam, Wisconsin
- Linton Daily Citizen, the former name of Greene County Daily World, a daily newspaper in Linton Township, Ohio
- Urbana Daily Citizen, a daily newspaper in Urbana, Ohio

== Other uses ==
- Daily Citizen (British newspaper), a short-lived newspaper

== See also ==
- The Citizen (disambiguation)
