= Citizen of Paris =

Citizen of Paris (French: Citoyens de Paris) can refer to a number of things:

- An honorary title bestowed by the King of France upon a citizen for services rendered
- An anonymous burgher of Paris about 1393, who wrote a book of instruction to his wife giving a rare lively account of the age (The Goodman of Paris/Le Ménagier de Paris)
- Memoirs by Doctor Louis Désiré Véron from 1815 to 1852 (Mémoires d'un Bourgeois de Paris)
- "Les dimanches d'un bourgeois de Paris", a story by Guy de Maupassant

== See also ==
- List of honorary citizens of Paris
- Citizen (disambiguation)
- Citizen X (disambiguation)
