= Citizen Force =

Citizen Force, Citizens Forces or Citizens' Defence Force may refer to:

== Military reserve forces ==
- Citizen Force (South Africa)
  - Citizen Force, a wing of South West African Territorial Force (SWATF)
- Citizens Forces, former name of the Australian Army Reserve; also known as "Citizen Military Forces"

== Politics ==
- 'Citizen Force', English name of Fuerza Ciudadana (Colombia), a party that took part in the 2023 Colombian regional and municipal elections
- Citizens' Forces, a political party in Morocco
- Citizen Force Party, Mexican political party between 2002 and 2003
- Citizen Force (Peru), party founded 2019, merged with another party in 2022

== Other uses ==
- Citizens' Defence Force, former secret anti-insurrection unit set up by British military in Ireland in the early 1920s

== See also ==
- Citizen Air Force
- Civil Air Patrol
- Militia
- National Guard
- People's Defense Force (disambiguation)
- State defense force
- Citizen Soldier (disambiguation)
- Territorial Army (disambiguation)
