= I sing of Olaf =

Poem

"i sing of Olaf" (sometimes referred to as "i sing of Olaf glad and big") is a poem by E.E. Cummings. It first appeared in Cummings' 1931 collection ViVa. It depicts the life of Olaf, a conscientious objector and pacifist during the First World War who is tortured by the United States Army but nonetheless "will not kiss your fucking flag", and subsequently dies in prison.

== History ==
The poem is based on the true story of a "big blond conscientious objector who was reading Sir Thomas Browne", whom Cummings briefly encountered while stationed at Camp Devens in 1918; Susan Cheever noted that Cummings never learned the man's name, and only "vividly imagined his fate".

== Analysis ==
Harold Bloom noted the similarity of the opening stanza to that of Virgil's Aeneid, and stated that as a "true pacifist" rather than a "grandstanding rebel with a cause", Olaf was "more closely akin to Melville's 'Bartleby' than fellow conscientious objector Mohammed Ali".

Literary scholar Gary Lane observed that the poem's "laconic conclusion" prefigures W. H. Auden's "The Unknown Citizen" and contrasted Olaf (whose heroic values are based in peace) to Achilles (whose heroic values are based in war). Macha Rosenthal stated that he "learned more about the abuse of power from 'i sing of Olaf' than [he] had imagined possible."

== Censorship ==
Although the poem's original publication contained the word "fucking", anthologies typically bowdlerized this to "f.ing"; similarly, Olaf's statement that "there is some shit i will not eat" is typically rendered as "there is some s. i will not eat".

== Homages ==
"i sing of Olaf" was the inspiration for Marco Stroppa's 2005 piece "I will not kiss your fucking flag".
