= Balaji Srinivasan =

American entrepreneur and investor (born 1980)

- Srinivasan in 2026
- Born: May 24, 1980 (age 46); Long Island, New York, U.S.
- Citizenship: United States (1980–2023) Singapore (from 2023)
- Education: Stanford University (BS, MS, MS, PhD)
- Known for: Author of The Network State; Former CTO of Coinbase; Former general partner at Andreessen Horowitz
- Website: https://balajis.com/

Balaji S. Srinivasan (born May 24, 1980) is an American-born Singaporean entrepreneur and investor. He is the author of The Network State: How to Start a New Country and the founder of the Network School, a retreat for entrepreneurs and technicians in Kazakhstan.

Previously, he was the co-founder of the genomics company Counsyl, the chief technology officer (CTO) of cryptocurrency exchange Coinbase, and a general partner at the venture capital firm Andreessen Horowitz.

== Biography ==
Srinivasan is the son of physician parents who immigrated from Tamil Nadu, India. Srinivasan grew up on Long Island, in Plainview, New York. He received BS, MS, and PhD degrees in electrical engineering from Stanford University and a MS in chemical engineering, also from Stanford. He taught courses in statistics and bioinformatics at Stanford and an online Stanford course called Startup Engineering.

In 2014, Startup Engineering was ranked by Business Insider as the sixth "Most Popular Free Online Course For Professionals." His Google Scholar profile lists over 5,000 citations for publications on diagnostics, microbial genomics, and population genetics in Genome Research, Nature Biotechnology, and the New England Journal of Medicine.

In 2007, Srinivasan co-founded genetic testing company Counsyl, which provided tests to prospective parents to screen for over 100 Mendelian diseases. In 2010, Counsyl received the Wall Street Journal Innovation Award for Medicine, and was named one of Scientific American's Top 10 World Changing Ideas. In 2013, MIT added Srinivasan to its MIT TR35 list for his work on clinical genomics. Counsyl was acquired by Myriad Genetics for $375 million in 2018.

In 2013, Srinivasan joined the venture capital firm Andreessen Horowitz as a general partner. While at the firm, he made early investments in OpenGov, Omada Health, and Benchling.

In 2013, Srinivasan co-founded 21e6, which later became 21 Inc, a Bitcoin mining startup raising over $116 million from investors. The company later became Earn.com, which allowed senders to pay users in cryptocurrency to reply to emails. In April 2018, Earn.com was acquired by Coinbase for $120 million.

After Coinbase purchased Earn.com, it became Coinbase Earn and Srinivasan became Coinbase's first CTO. While at Coinbase, Srinivasan oversaw the addition of new tokens, including Zcash and stablecoins. He left the company in 2019. Coinbase's 2021 SEC filings reported that Coinbase Earn's revenue was $7.7 million in 2020 and $63.1 million in 2021.

In April 2014, Srinivasan co-founded Teleport, a job search engine. Teleport was acquired by Topia in 2017. Over the course of that year, Srinivasan co-founded Coin Center, a nonprofit research and advocacy group focused on cryptocurrency policy, where he is as a board member.

In December 2023, Srinivasan launched the Balaji Fund, a venture fund with investors such as Coinbase CEO Brian Armstrong, AngelList co-founder Naval Ravikant, and venture capitalist Fred Wilson.

According to the US's Quarterly Publication of Individuals Who Have Chosen to Expatriate, Srinivasan renounced his US citizenship in 2023. While his name was initially misspelled in the register as "Sirinivasan", a subsequent correction rectified the spelling. In 2026, Srinivasan called himself "a citizen of Singapore" via social media.

== The Network State ==
In 2013, in a talk at Y Combinator's Startup School titled "Silicon Valley's Ultimate Exit" and in a Wired article called "Software Is Reorganizing the World", Srinivasan urged the technology industry to digitally exit the United States and move abroad. The talk was received positively by Reason, Wired, and Bloomberg; and was criticized by The New York Times, TechCrunch, Business Insider, and The Wall Street Journal. Srinivasan first used the phrase "network state" in a 2015 conversation with former Estonian President Toomas Ilves, drawing on Estonia's e-residency program as a real world precedent. Srinivasan was one of the first three Estonian e-residents. In a 2017 Wall Street Journal interview, Srinivasan described the vision as the "inverse Amish," a society that, "lives nearby, peacefully, in the future" and experimenting with new technologies. Yale Law professor Stephen L. Carter called the talk, "provocative, well-conceived and, in some ways, attractive."

In 2022, Srinivasan wrote The Network State: How To Start a New Country, where he elaborated on his ideas about online nationality. In July 2022, the book was ranked number two in bestselling e-books by The Wall Street Journal. The book describes the concept of a "network state" in which digital communities crowdfund territories around the world and link them together to build startup societies that eventually attain diplomatic recognition. Politico called the book "quintessentially American" and stated that the Network State's ideas have "purchase in political and intellectual circles." The ideas in the book were inspired by the work of the economist Albert O. Hirschman, who sees two basic paths to reform, one called voice (remake the system from within) and another called exit (leave and build something new). After TechCrunch mentioned the speech in an article exploring links between Silicon Valley tech leaders and the far-right Dark Enlightenment movement, Srinivasan wrote in an email to Dark Enlightenment leader Curtis Yarvin, "If things get hot, it may be interesting to sic the Dark Enlightenment audience on a single vulnerable hostile reporter to dox them and turn them inside out with hostile reporting sent to *their* advertisers/friends/contacts."

CitizenX (formerly The Network State Company AG), a Swiss immigration advisory company, references the "Network State" concept from Srinivasan's 2022 book The Network State. Srinivasan was also an early financial backer of CitizenX.

=== Reception and influence ===
The book was received positively by libertarian outlets such as Reason magazine and the Competitive Enterprise Institute, and conservative publications including Tablet magazine. Gabriel Gatehouse, writing for the BBC called the network state "Nietzschean, Lucas Ropek of Gizmodo described it as "neocolonialist" in an article named "Worst New Trend of 2024", and Anand Giridharadas of The New York Times called it millenarian.

In 2025, the Financial Times reported that the network state movement had grown to approximately 120 startup societies, with Replit founder Amjad Masad and seasteading advocate Patri Friedman among its prominent supporters. The BBC also profiled the movement.

== The Network School ==
In September 2024, Srinivasan started The Network School, a school focused on health, technology and startup societies. The school had an initial enrollment of 150 with enrollment increasing by 400 in mid-2025. It was located on "an island near Singapore" in Forest City, Johor, Malaysia. In July 2026, the Network School's operations in Malaysia were shut down by the government for alleged administrative violations soon after controversy arose over accusations that the school was hosting citizens of Israel, who are banned from entering Malaysia.

After The Network School left Malaysia, they moved to Kazakhstan. Srinivasan and Kazakhstan signed a five-year memorandum of understanding which permitted the construction of a new campus and an annual Network State conference. The Kazakhstan government and the Network School are also organizing international events and hackathons. Kazakhstan's Ministry of Artificial Intelligence and Digital Development stated, "This memorandum will form the basis for the implementation of joint projects and the further development of Kazakhstan as a regional center for artificial intelligence and innovation."

== Public profile ==
MIT Technology Review named Srinivasan on its list of "Innovators Under 35" in 2013. In 2018, Fortune ranked him 26th on its "The Ledger 40 Under 40" list. Srinivasan has also published articles in Foreign Policy, Wired,, and the Free Press. He gave keynote addresses at the Cato Institute and the Foresight Institute.

In 2017, the Trump Administration considered appointing Srinivasan as FDA Commissioner. While being considered for the appointment, Srinivasan deleted all of his tweets, including tweets critical of the FDA. In one such deleted tweet, Srinivasan wrote, "For every thalidomide, many dead from slowed approvals." In July 2020, Srinivasan drew attention after criticizing Taylor Lorenz's reporting alleged misbehavior of Away's CEO on Twitter. On the Twitter thread, he suggested Lorenz and activists like her are "sociopaths".

In January 2020, Srinivasan was among the first technology investors to publicly warn about the COVID-19 pandemic, a call acknowledged in Bloomberg, and by the American Enterprise Institute. The New York Times said that his early tweets influenced others to prepare. Reason interviewed Srinivasan on the same day the World Health Organization (WHO) declared a global pandemic, noting he had been ahead of the curve in warning about the crisis. Bloomberg said that Srinivasan had sounded the alarm early by criticizing the city of San Francisco for its plans to host a Chinese New Year parade during the outbreak.

On March 17, 2023, Srinivasan bet economist James Medlock that one bitcoin (then worth less than $30,000) would be worth $1 million in 90 days. Srinivasan made the bet after Medlock tweeted, "I'll bet anyone $1 million dollars that the US does not enter hyperinflation." Srinivasan conceded the bet early and paid an additional US$500,000 to Bitcoin core developers. Brandon Kochkodin of Forbes remarked shortly after the bet was made that Srinivasan owns "a considerable amount of bitcoin" and his $1 million bet on Bitcoin "might be a mere marketing ploy or even a pump-and-dump scheme". Srinivasan later said he made the bet as a warning against the fragility of the U.S. banking system after the collapse of Silicon Valley Bank. Ninety days after Srinivasan made his bet, the price of a bitcoin was down roughly 3 percent from its March 17, 2023 price.

In 2024, as part of his Network State concept where people migrate to a new state that uses blockchain technology, Srinivasan called for bringing "digital citizens" into the physical world on a new plot of land. He proposed that individuals in San Francisco loyal to tech companies would wear gray t-shirts and be allowed into certain districts of the city from which "blue" liberals would be banned.
