= N/A =

Abbreviation for "not available", etc

N/A (or sometimes n/a or N.A.) is a common abbreviation in tables and lists for the phrases not applicable, not available, not assessed, or no answer. It is used to indicate when information in a certain table cell is not provided, either because it does not apply to a particular case in question or because the answer is not available. Such a notation can be used on many different types of forms.

The notation was in use at least as early as the 1920s, with a 1925 guide to conducting community surveys instructing those asking questions for the survey:

Some of the questions on the card are of course not applicable at all times. For instance, a household composed of two widowed sisters living on their income has no wage earner. The survey director should request that the initials "n a" ("not applicable") be written down opposite such questions. No space should be left blank.

The guide goes on to indicate that every blank should be filled, even if only to indicate that the blank is not applicable, so that those processing the surveys would be able to see that the blank had not merely been overlooked. An Information Circular from the U.S. Department of the Interior, Bureau of Mines, from the same year specified that it used "NA" to indicate that information was "not available" and "NAp" to indicate that a category information was "Not applicable".

In the early years of computer programming, computerized forms that required fields to be filled in could cause problems where the field was one for which no answer would be applicable to certain persons filling out the form. Before programmers became aware of a problem with a particular field, persons filling out that field might fill it in with a term such as this, which the program processing the form would misinterpret as an intent to provide the requested information. For example, if a form contained a field for a middle name, and the person filling out the form put "N/A", the computer might interpret this as "N/A" being the person's middle name; this in turn might result in the person receiving mail from the company that produced the form with "N/A" where a middle name would normally appear.

== See also ==
- Nomen nescio
- To be announced
