= John Dowe =

John Dowe may refer to:

- John M. Dowe, American politician in Connecticut
- John Leslie Dowe, Australian botanist

== See also ==
- John Doe (disambiguation)
