= X (comics) =

X, in comics, may refer to:

- X (Dark Horse Comics), a character and series by Dark Horse Comics
- X (manga), a Japanese manga, also known as X/1999

== See also ==
- X (disambiguation)
- Mister X (comics)
