= Man on the Street =

Man on the street may refer to:

- Vox populi or person on the street, a common interview style
- The Man on the Street, a 1941 Italian film
- "Man on the Street" (Dollhouse), a 2009 television episode

== See also ==
- List of terms referring to an average person
- Man in the Street (disambiguation)
