= Numerius (praenomen) =

Latin personal name

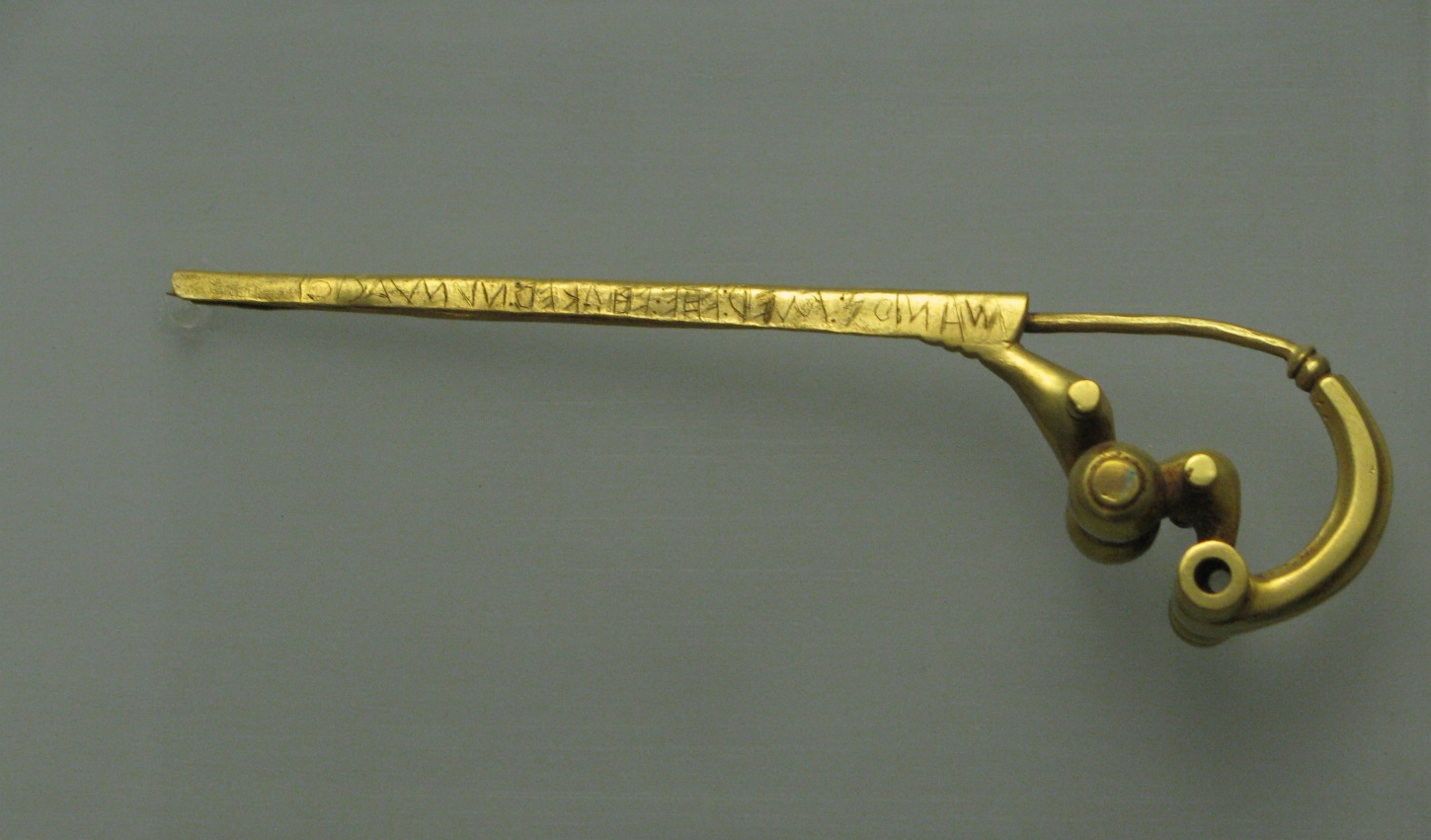
The Praenestine fibula, a brooch dating to the early seventh century BC, inscribed with one of the oldest known inscriptions in Latin: Manios med fhe fhaked Numasioi, "Manius made me for Numerius".

Numerius (/njuːˈmɛriəs/ new-MERR-ee-əs, Latin: [nʊˈmɛri.ʊs]), feminine Numeria, is a Latin praenomen, or personal name, usually abbreviated N. The name was never especially common, but was used throughout the period of the Roman Republic, and into imperial times. The praenomen also gave rise to the patronymic gens Numeria.

Although Numerius was occasionally used by patrician gentes, such as the Furii and the Valerii, the only patrician family to use the name regularly was the gens Fabia. Festus relates the story of how Numerius was introduced to the family after a survivor of the Battle of the Cremera married a daughter of Numerius Otacilius of Maleventum. The name was used more widely amongst the plebeians and in the countryside, and was relatively common in southern Italy. In Roman law, the name Numerius Negidius was used to refer to a hypothetical defendant.

== Origin and meaning ==
Numerius was generally connected with Numeria, the goddess of childbirth, and according to Varro was given to children who were born quickly and easily. Elsewhere, Varro states that the feminine Numeria was not used as a praenomen, but this is contradicted by the Liber de Praenominibus, a short treatise on praenomina usually appended to Valerius Maximus. As a praenomen, Numeria is attested in the funerary inscription of Numeria Atilia at Praeneste; other instances of the name in inscriptions probably represent gentilicia.

Based in part on the story related by Festus, as well as various Oscan inscriptions and the popularity of the name in southern Italy, Chase describes Numerius as an Oscan praenomen. However, the name was widely used in Latium, and in the archaic form Numasios it is found in a number of Old Latin inscriptions, including the famous Praenestine fibula, and it may well be an example of a praenomen that was shared by both Oscan and Latin. Under the spelling Numesius, it also appears in one of the earliest Etruscan inscriptions, on a vase from Tarquinii dating to about 700 BC.

== Bibliography ==
- Marcus Terentius Varro, De Lingua Latina (On the Latin Language), Fragmenta (Fragments).
- Liber de Praenominibus, a short treatise of uncertain authorship, traditionally appended to Valerius Maximus' Factorum ac Dictorum Memorabilium (Memorable Facts and Sayings).
- Sextus Pompeius Festus, Epitome de M. Verrio Flacco de Verborum Significatu (Epitome of Marcus Verrius Flaccus' On the Meaning of Words).
- Theodor Mommsen et al, Corpus Inscriptionum Latinarum (The Body of Latin Inscriptions, abbreviated CIL), Berlin-Brandenburgische Akademie der Wissenschaften (1853–present).
- Chase, George Davis (1897). "The Origin of Roman Praenomina". Harvard Studies in Classical Philology. VIII: 103–184.
- Ogilvie, Robert M; Drummond, Andrew (1989). "The sources for early Roman history". In Walbank, F W; et al. (eds.). The rise of Rome to 220 BC. Cambridge Ancient History. Vol. 7 Pt. 2 (2nd ed.). Cambridge University Press. pp. 1–29. ISBN 0-521-23446-8.
- Kajava, Mika (1994). Roman Female Praenomina: Studies in the Nomenclature of Roman Women. Acta Instituti Romani Finlandiae.
- Robinson, Olivia F (1997). The Sources of Roman Law: Problems and Sources for Ancient Historians. London: Routledge.
- Smith, William, ed. (1849). Dictionary of Greek and Roman Biography and Mythology. Boston: Little, Brown and Company.
