= Good Citizen =

Good Citizen or Good Citizens may refer to:

== Books ==
- The Good Citizen, right wing journal 1913-1933
- The Good Citizen (pamphlet), 1947 pamphlet by Leo Burnett
- Good Citizens (book), book by Thích Nhất Hạnh

== Other ==
- Good Citizen (album), album by Canadian jazz pianist Kris Davis 2010
- "The Good Citizen" (Flashpoint episode), a 2010 episode of Flashpoint

== See also ==
- Citizen (disambiguation)
