= Non-citizens (disambiguation) =

Non-citizens are foreign-born residents who have not been naturalized.

Non-citizens or non-citizen may also refer to:

- Non-citizens (Latvia)
- Non-citizens (Estonia)

== See also ==
- Citizen (disambiguation)
