= Mr. Citizen =

Mr. Citizen may refer to:

- Mr. Citizen (book), a 1960 autobiography of U.S. president Harry S. Truman, covering his life after leaving the presidency
- Mr. Citizen (TV series), a 1955 American anthology series of dramas based on actual acts of heroism performed by average people

== See also ==
- Citizen (disambiguation)
