= Comrades (disambiguation) =

Comrade means friend, colleague, or ally.

Comrade or Comrades may also refer to:

== Arts, literature and entertainment ==
- Comrade (2012 film), also called Into the White
- Comrade (2017 film), a Bengali drama film
- Comrades (TV series), a 1983-84 BBC television documentary series
- Comrades (1919 film), a German silent film
- Comrades (1921 film), a German silent film
- Comrades (1941 film), a German historical film
- Comrades (1928 film), an American silent film
- Comrades (1986 film), a British historical drama film
- Comrades (The Americans), the first episode of the second season of the television series The Americans
- Comrades: Almost a Love Story, a 1996 Hong Kong film
- Comrades (band), an American rock band

== Organizations ==
- Western Springs AFC, formally Comrades FC
- Comrades Association, a communist organization that was operative in the State of Hyderabad in India
- Comrades Party, a left-wing Iranian political party active during the 1940s

== Other ==
- Comrade (horse) (1917–1928), British Thoroughbred racehorse
- Jonathan James (1983–2008), a teenage hacker known as cOmrade
- The Comrade, former weekly English-language newspaper, India

== See also ==
- Comrades Marathon, an ultramarathon in South Africa
