= Mister X =

Mister X or Mr. X is commonly used as a pseudonym for someone whose name is secret or unknown.

Mister X may refer to:

== Comics ==
- Mister X (Marvel Comics), a supervillain in the Marvel Universe
- Mister X (Vortex), the protagonist in Dean Motter's comic book series of that title
- The Amazing Mr X (comics), Britain's first superhero, who first appeared in The Dandy comic in 1944

== Video games ==
- Mr. X (Resident Evil), antagonist first appearing in the 1998 video game Resident Evil 2
- A villain in the video game series Streets of Rage
- The villain in the video game The Ship
- The final villain in the video game Kung-Fu Master
- The pseudonym of Dr. Wily in Mega Man 6
  - Xander Payne, a character from the Mega Man Archie comics
- The pseudonym of Olga Gurlukovich during the Big Shell Incident in Metal Gear Solid 2: Sons of Liberty

== Film and television ==
- Mister X (1958 film), a Soviet musical film directed by Yuli Khmelnitsky
- Mister X (1967 film), an Italian superhero film directed by Piero Vivarelli also known as Avenger X
- Mr. X (1987 film), a Bollywood sci-fi film starring Amol Palekar directed by Khwaja Ahmad Abbas
- Mr. X (2015 film), a Bollywood sci-fi film starring Emraan Hashmi, remake of Mr. X in Bombay (1964)
- Mr. X (2026 film), an upcoming Indian Tamil-language spy action thriller film
- Mr. X, a character in the 1991 Oliver Stone film, JFK.
- Mr. X, the titular character of the 1964 Indian sci-fi film Mr. X in Bombay
- Mr. X, a recurring puppet on The Canadian Howdy Doody Show
- Mr. X, a recurring arch-criminal of comic Arabic films played by Fouad el-Mohandes
- Mr. X, in the animated series The X's
- Mr. X, a villain in the anime series Lupin III
- Mr. X (Simpsons), Homer's pseudonym in The Simpsons episode "The Computer Wore Menace Shoes"
- X (The X-Files), a character in the television series The X-Files
- The Amazing Mr. X, a.k.a. The Spiritualist, a 1948 thriller film
- Mr. X, the main character in the 1940s and 1950s radio and TV series The Man Called X
- Mr. X, an assassin in the 2008 film Wanted, played by David O'Hara
- Mr. X, a character who appears in the Fringe episode "Lysergic Acid Diethylamide"
- Mr. X, the pseudonym for Goofy in the animated short Aquamania
- Mr. X, a Teenage Mutant Ninja Turtles character associated with Mondo Gecko
- The placeholder name the farmer is given when he gets amnesia in the Shaun the Sheep Movie
- Mr. X, a secondary character in Big Time Rush
- Mr. X (Amphibia character), a character in Amphibia
  - "Mr. X" (Amphibia episode), the character's eponymous debut episode

== Music ==
- Mister X (band), a street punk group from Belarus
- "Mr X", a song by Alex Lifeson from his album Victor
- "Mr X", a song by Ultravox from their album Vienna
- "Mr X", a song and single by Pauline Murray And The Invisible Girls
- Mister X, a character in the operetta Die Zirkusprinzessin (The Circus Princess) by Emmerich Kálmán
- Mr.X, American DJ also known as Afrika Islam
- Mr. X, mystery music composer of the film Enai Noki Paayum Thota
- Mr. X, drummer formerly in the band The Meatmen
- Mr. X, a character from God in Three Persons

== Pseudonymous uses ==
- Donald Graves (Kremlinologist) (1929–2008), U.S. State Department analyst, from the 1982 Washington Post article "The Secret Files of Mr. X"
- George F. Kennan (1904–2005), American historian, in his essay "The Sources of Soviet Conduct"
- Carl Sagan (1934–1996), American astronomer, in an essay on his experiences with marijuana
- Norman Wexler (1926–1999), American screenwriter, in Bob Zmuda's Andy Kaufman Revealed
- Gaston Defferre (1910–1986), French Politician, using this pseudonym during the 1965 Presidential Elections
- Ben Zygier, a prisoner who was held in Israel
- The former longtime boyfriend of American radio talk show host, Robin Quivers
- John Mutton (Canadian politician) (born c. 1966), mayor of Clarington, Ontario, for his role in the Greenbelt scandal

== Other uses ==
- Mr. X (novel), a novel by Peter Straub
- "Mr. X", nickname of American golfer Miller Barber (1931–2013)
- Mr. X, a masked professional wrestler in the 1930s and 1940s, one of the identities of Cyclone Mackey
- Mr. X, a masked professional wrestler in the WWF in the 1970s, one of the identities of Jerry Balisok
- Mr. X, a masked professional wrestler in the WWF in the 1980s, one of the identities of Dan Marsh
- Mr. X, a player character in the board game Scotland Yard and its spin-off, Mister X
- Mister X, an alias used by Mayuka Kondō in the manga and anime series, Oniichan no Koto Nanka Zenzen Suki Janain Dakara ne!!

== See also ==
- Doctor X (disambiguation)
- Miss X (disambiguation)
- Professor X (disambiguation)
- Nomen nescio (often abbreviated as N.N.)
- Placeholder name
- John Doe
- X (disambiguation)
