= Mobile Citizen =

Mobile Citizen may also refer to:

- IDB Mobile Citizen, is an initiative of the Science and Technology Division of the Inter-American Development Bank.
- Mobile Citizen (SD Gundam), a type of robotic character appearing in the SD Gundam franchise.

== See also ==
- Citizen (disambiguation)
