= The Citizen =

The Citizen may refer to:

== Newspapers ==
=== United States ===
- The Citizen (Auburn), in New York
- Citizen (Chicago newspaper), an Illinois newspaper group also producing the Ravenswood Citizen, North Side Citizen, and Uptown Citizen at various times from 1910 to 1930
- The Cushing Citizen, a daily newspaper in Oklahoma
- The Citizen (Georgia), a weekly newspaper for Fayette County, Georgia
- The Citizen (Kansas City), a regional monthly newspaper
- The Citizen (Laconia), a broadsheet published in New Hampshire
  - Foster's Sunday Citizen, the Sunday version of the Laconia paper, published with Foster's Daily Democrat of Dover, New Hampshire
- The Citizen (Vermont), a weekly newspaper for Charlotte and Hinesburg, Vermont
- The Key West Citizen, in Florida
- The Citizen (Culver City), a former newspaper in California

=== United Kingdom ===
- Aberdeen Citizen, former free newspaper in Aberdeen
- The Citizen (Blackburn), a local newspaper in Blackburn
- The Citizen (Gloucester)
- The Citizen (Lynn), in King's Lynn

=== Other places ===
- The Ottawa Citizen, Canada
- The Citizen (Russia), a conservative political and literary magazine/newspaper
- The Citizen (South Africa), a national English-language tabloid
- The Citizen (South Sudan)
- The Citizen (Tanzania), an English-language newspaper

== Other uses ==
- The Citizen (play), 1761, by Arthur Murphy
- The Citizen (film), a 2012 independent drama
- The Citizen (character), from the novel Ulysses by James Joyce
- The Citizens, a nickname for Manchester City F.C.
- The Citizens, a former nickname for Norwich City F.C.

== See also ==
- The Daily Citizen (disambiguation)
- Citizen (disambiguation)
