= Citizen Soldier =

Citizen Soldier(s) may refer to:

- Citizen soldier, a member of a militia
- Citizen Soldier (film), a 1976 drama film
- Citizen Soldier (TV program)
- 2016 Citizen Soldier 400, a 2016 NASCAR race
- "Citizen/Soldier", a song by 3 Doors Down
- Citizen Soldiers, a 1997 book by Stephen E. Ambrose
- Citizen Soldier (character), a character in the comic book series Stormwatch: Team Achilles
- Citizen Soldier (band), a rock band formed in 2016

== See also ==
- Citizen Force (disambiguation)
- Citizen (disambiguation)
