= Jane Doe (disambiguation) =

Jane Doe is a placeholder name for a party whose true identity is unknown or must be otherwise withheld; especially if the unknown party is known, perceived or presumed to be female (a girl or woman).

Jane Doe may also refer to:

== Film and television ==
- Jane Doe (2001 film), a 2001 American television film
- Jane Doe (film series), on the Hallmark cable channel
- The Autopsy of Jane Doe, a 2016 American supernatural horror film
- "Jane Doe", an episode of The Art of Sarah

== Music ==
- Jane Doe (album), a 2001 album by the band Converge
- "Jane Doe", a bonus track by Dutch symphonic metal band Within Temptation on their album The Silent Force
- "Jane Doe", a song by Alicia Keys from the album Songs in A Minor
- "Jane Doe", a song by Nik Kershaw from the album To Be Frank
- "Jane Doe" (Minami Takahashi song)
- "Jane Doe" (Kenshi Yonezu and Hikaru Utada song)
- "Jane Doe", a song by Never Shout Never from the album What Is Love?
- "Jane Doe", a song by Korean girl group Ladies' Code from the 2016 album Strang3r

== Characters ==
- Ms. Jane Doe, a character on the cartoon series Camp Lazlo
- Jane Doe, the name given to a character played by Jaimie Alexander in the TV series Blindspot
- Jane Doe (character), a DC Comics enemy of Batman
- Jane Doe, a character in the musical Ride the Cyclone
- Jane Doe (Zenless Zone Zero), a character in the 2024 free-to-play action role-playing game

== See also ==
- John Doe (disambiguation)
