= Multitude =

Multitude or multitudes may refer to:

- Multitude: War and Democracy in the Age of Empire, a 2004 book by Antonio Negri and Michael Hardt
- Multitude SE, a payday lender based in Finland
- Multitude (album), a 2022 album by Belgian musician, Stromae
- Multitudes (album), a 2023 album by Feist
- "Multitude", a song by Half Man Half Biscuit from the album Four Lads Who Shook the Wirral
- Multitude (philosophy), a philosophical term for a group of people not classed under any other distinct category, except for their shared fact of existence

== See also ==
- The Masses (disambiguation)
