= Citizen Dog =

Citizen Dog may refer to:

- Citizen Dog (comic strip), an American newspaper comic strip
- Citizen Dog (film), a 2004 Thai film

== See also ==
- Citizen (disambiguation)
