= Tom, Dick and Harry (disambiguation) =

Tom, Dick and Harry is a placeholder phrase for multiple unspecified people.

Tom, Dick and Harry may also refer to:

- Tom, Dick and Harry (1941 film), an American comedy
- Tom, Dick, and Harry (2006 film), a Bollywood comedy by Deepak Tijori
- Tom, Dick and Harry (musical), Broadway musical by composer Egbert Van Alstyne and writers Aaron Hoffman and Harry Williams
- Tom, Dick and Harry (novel), an 1894 novel by Talbot Baines Reed
- "Tom, Dick or Harry" (song), from the 1948 musical Kiss Me, Kate
- Tom, Dick and Harry, codename for tunnels dug under the Stalag Luft III prisoner of war camp as part of the Great Escape during WWII.

== See also ==
- Tom Dick and Harry Mountain, Oregon, U.S.
- Tom, Dick, and Harry, Rock Again!, its 2009 sequel film by Rahul Kapoor
- Tom, Dick and Harriet, a 1980s British sitcom
- Tom, Dick and Sally, a UK comic strip
- Tom, Dick, and Mary, a 1960s American sitcom in the 90 Bristol Court programming block
