= CitizenX =

Swiss company

- Type: Private
- Industry: Technology, investment migration
- Founded: 2021
- Founders: Alex Recouso; Luis Ivan Cuende
- Headquarters: Zug, Switzerland
- Key people: Alex Recouso (CEO); Katie Ananina (CMO)
- Website: citizenx.com

CitizenX is a Swiss technology and immigration advisory company based in Zug. The company operates an online platform that assists high-net-worth individuals in acquiring additional citizenships through citizenship by investment (CBI) and citizenship by descent (CBD) programs.

CitizenX operates under the Swiss entity The Network State Company AG. It was named after The Network State (2022) written by Balaji Srinivasan, who also backed the company along with Tim Draper.

== History ==
CitizenX was co-founded in 2021 by Spanish businessmen Luis Ivan Cuende and Alex Recouso. Recouso, who serves as the company's Chief Executive Officer, previously founded a company called Baseflow, which later merged into The Network State Company before being renamed as CitizenX. The company established its headquarters in Zug. CitizenX has been backed by investors such as Tim Draper and Balaji Srinivasan.

In June 2024, Alex Recouso participated in the United Nations SIDS4 (Small Island Developing States) conference, where he discussed the role of citizenship-by-investment programs in generating foreign direct investment for smaller nations.

In April 2025, CitizenX acquired Plan B Passport, a firm in the investment migration industry that focused on helping investors obtain second passports. Plan B Passport was originally founded by Katie Ananina. The merger expanded CitizenX's platform to include more than 25 citizenship, citizenship by descent, and residency programs worldwide.

== Services ==
CitizenX operates a digital platform and concierge service where users can apply for, invest in, and manage a "portfolio" of citizenships and residencies. The company integrates Swiss privacy laws and encryption in order to protect personal applicant data. CitizenX promotes the concepts of "Flag Theory" and the "Sovereign Individual" as described in the 1997 book The Sovereign Individual, which involve diversifying residencies and citizenships to gain optionality, optimize tax strategies, and minimize dependency on any single nation-state. This philosophy has grown increasingly popular among high-net-worth individuals relocating internationally in response to wealth taxes and changing fiscal policies in locations such as California and Norway. The company's former legal name, The Network State Company AG references the "Network State" concept from the 2022 book The Network State: How to Start a New Country by Balaji Srinivasan.

CitizenX serves as a primary processing partner for El Salvador's "Freedom Passport" (officially the Adopting El Salvador Freedom Visa program), an investment migration initiative.

== See also ==
- Balaji Srinivasan
- Economic citizenship
- Henley & Partners
- Immigrant investor programs
- Multiple citizenship
- The Sovereign Individual
