= Murder of Vivianne Ruiz =

1991 Australian murder involving unique fingerprint evidence

Vivianne Lynda Ruiz
- Born: 5 May 1969; Spain
- Died: 23-25 December 1991 (age 22); Arncliffe, Sydney, Australia
- Cause of death: Blunt trauma, ligature strangulation
- Body discovered: 28 December 1991
- Known for: Murder victim

The murder of Vivianne Ruiz occurred in Sydney, Australia. Her body was discovered in garbage bags on 28 December 1991 without any identification. A postmortem found strangulation to be the likely cause of death. Animal hairs were found on the body, and newspaper was stuffed inside her mouth.

On its removal, fingerprints in what appeared to be blood were present but could not be immediately identified. Investigators spent many weeks attempting to identify the victim. A sustained and significant media campaign was also conducted. Investigators were eventually contacted by a former associate of the victim who recognised her as Vivianne Ruiz.

Investigators discovered Ruiz had been in a relationship with Richard White, a convicted criminal with a history of assault and drug trafficking. He had grown to know Ruiz through her work as a prostitute and dancer in the Kings Cross nightclubs in Sydney. Investigators discovered White had left Australia shortly after Ruiz was found murdered. The fingerprint found on the newspaper Ruiz's killer had left in her throat was initially considered not to belong to White. Later testing demonstrated that a tonal reverse had occurred, a rare event where the valleys between fingerprint ridges transfer blood from the grooves of the fingerprint, as opposed to its ridges.

Investigators eventually tracked White to England, where he was living with relatives. A warrant was sought in England for his arrest, which was eventually made in Newcastle by local detectives and Scotland Yard. White returned to Australia to face trial for the murder. After two trials were aborted due to his abnormal conduct, he was eventually found guilty in 1996 and sentenced to the maximum jail term permitted in New South Wales at the time, which was fifteen years with a minimum of nine before being eligible for parole.

== Background ==
The body of a female was located on the side of a suburban street in Sydney, Australia on 28 December 1991. She was wrapped in garbage bags, indicating to investigators that the victim was murdered elsewhere and transported to the location. She had suffered head injuries, and officers observed something inside her mouth that appeared at the time to be paper. A ligature was around her throat. There was no identification found on the body. Investigators described the murder as a "frenzied attack", and "a callous, very brutal murder".

== Post-mortem ==
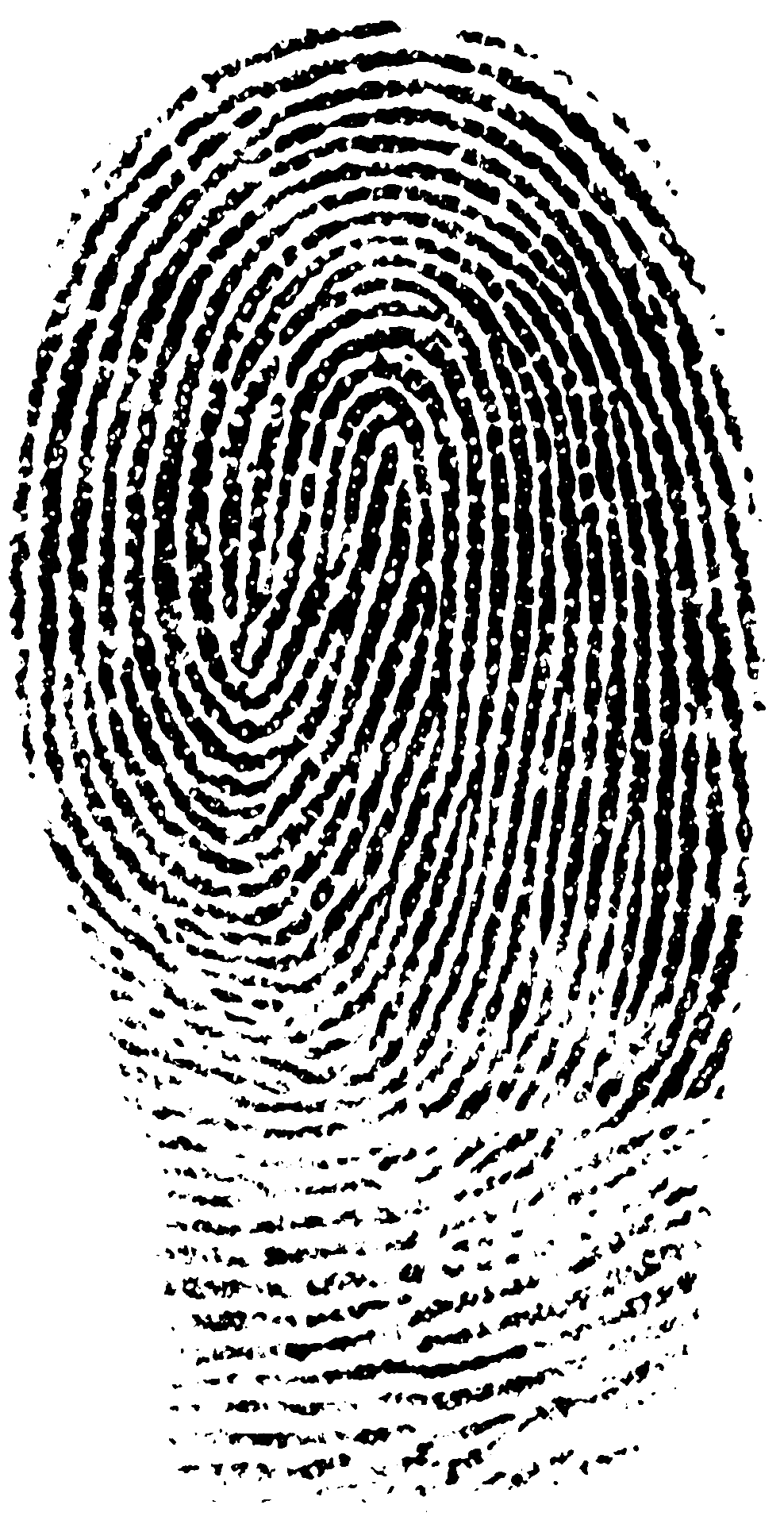
A fingerprint

A post mortem examination found the victim weighed 62 kg (137 lb) and was 1.61 m (5 ft 3 in) tall, and was estimated to be between 16 and 25 years old. The victim was found to have suffered injuries, with a wound on her head and strangulation marks on the throat. Bruises indicated she had been further injured after her death.

Newspaper was removed from the mouth and revealed to be two full-sized sheets of the Sydney Morning Herald, dated 10 December 1991. Three distinct fingerprint patterns were identified. The fingerprints were photographed, and then enhanced with ninhydrin, an organic compound that can detect fingerprints. The practice is commonly used by forensic investigators in the analysis of latent fingerprints on porous surfaces such as paper, as the amino acids in sweat secretions that gather on a finger's unique ridges transfer to surfaces when touched. Exposure of the surface to ninhydrin converts the amino acids into visibly coloured products and thus reveals the print. Once completed, the fingerprint was fed into the police fingerprint database, though no match was found.

A significant number of animal hairs were also found during the post-mortem. Tests showed that these were from a domestic dog, possibly a German Shepherd.

== Investigation ==
By the time the post-mortem was over, the body had not been identified. The victim's clothing led investigators to believe she had been local to the area.

Several weeks after the body was found, and despite a strong community response, investigators were frustrated at not being able to identify the victim. The murder was considered to be the "most puzzling murder mystery in Sydney for decades", with media reports observing that not since the 1930s had an inability to identify a victim caused such difficulty in a murder investigation.

Inspections of missing person files did not identify the victim, though many other missing person files were closed as a result.

=== Identification ===
Investigators fielded a significant number of calls each day from people offering information. Police eventually received a phone call from a witness who claimed to recognise the victim as her friend, Vivianne Ruiz. The witness viewed the items of property belonging to the victim in police possession and subsequently confirmed they belonged to Ruiz.

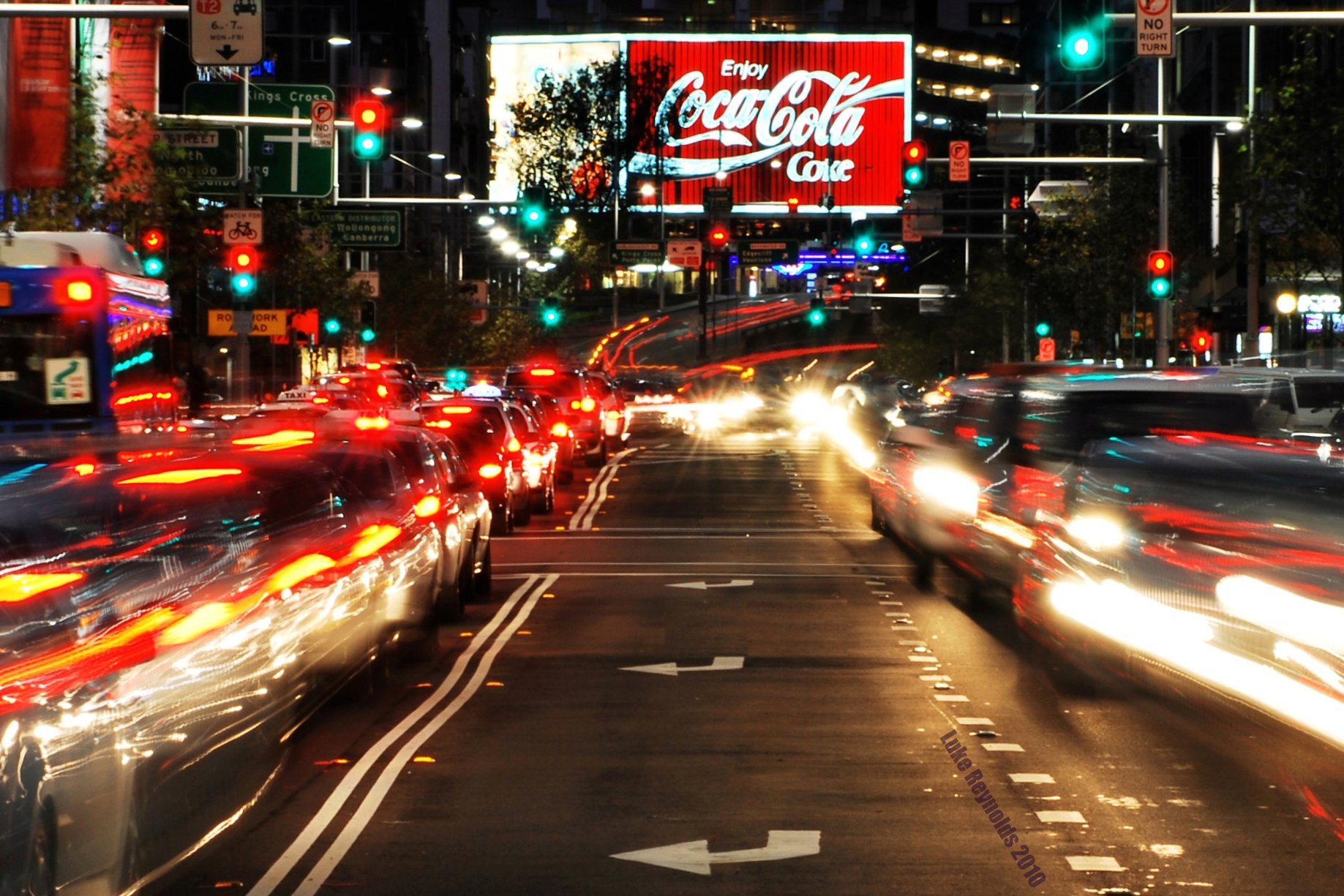
Kings Cross, Sydney

Investigators obtained a copy of a lease for a property in Kings Cross in the name of Ruiz, and fingerprints on the lease matched those of the victim. Dental records later positively identified Ruiz. Ruiz was born in Spain, and settled in Australia in 1982. She initially resided on the Gold Coast in Queensland before moving to Sydney. After moving to Sydney, Ruiz took up residence in the Kings Cross property and started working as a prostitute and dancer in local nightclubs.

=== Richard White ===
Investigators discovered Ruiz had been dating a man named Richard White, a bodybuilder and drug dealer who had previously beaten Ruiz.

A travel agent confirmed that Ruiz and White had been planning an overseas trip. The day before Ruiz's body was found, White cancelled the tickets and had the refund sent to his home.

White's fingerprints were compared to those found on the newspaper. The fingerprints were pictorially similar but not identical. Testing concluded the fingerprint was that of White. White, by pressing the paper firmly when placing it inside Ruiz's throat, had caused a tonal reverse, an event where the valleys between fingerprint ridges transfer blood from the grooves of the fingerprint as opposed to its ridges.

Investigators sent a uniformed police officer to the home of White's parents, who discovered he was currently living overseas at the house of his aunt and uncle in Newcastle, England. The police officer reported that the parents owned a German Shepherd. The investigators found White had previously owned a van, and after tracking down the new owner, they searched the van and discovered bloodstains and animal hairs inside it.

== Arrest ==
White was found to be living with his aunt and uncle at their home in Newcastle, the hometown of his parents. White was eventually arrested by detectives from the local police station and Scotland Yard on 29 April 1992. White did not resist the arrest, and his relatives were unaware of the police investigation. In his possession was a set of notes, one of which he had written to himself that stated "Convince yourself of your innocence...don't fuck up".

=== Extradition ===
New South Wales police applied to have White extradited to Australia. White eventually agreed to return to Sydney voluntarily to face murder charges, with a spokesperson stating White maintained his innocence but decided it was "in his best interests" to return. He arrived in Sydney on 13 September 1992. White was refused bail.

=== Pre-trial proceedings ===
A committal hearing was held for investigators to demonstrate to a court that there was sufficient evidence for White to stand trial for the murder of Ruiz. White's lawyer questioned investigators about the fingerprint found on the newspaper within Ruiz's throat. While conceding the fingerprint belonged to White, she argued investigators were unable to establish to the required evidentiary standard that the substance forming the fingerprint was blood. She went on to propose that the tests used to demonstrate a "positive" reaction to blood would have been the same for any protein-based substance. The lawyer concluded with an argument that White may have been eating a meat pie with tomato sauce on it while reading the newspaper and that such a food would react to the test used to demonstrate the fingerprint was blood. However, investigators rebutted this argument by demonstrating that the position of the fingerprint would have meant the newspaper was being read upside down at the time the fingerprint was made. White was sent to stand trial for the murder in the Supreme Court of New South Wales.

== Trial and conviction ==
Two attempts to try White for the murder were aborted due to his abnormal conduct, such as threatening to kill the judge and prosecutor. In June 1996, White stood trial for a third time and remained quiet during proceedings.

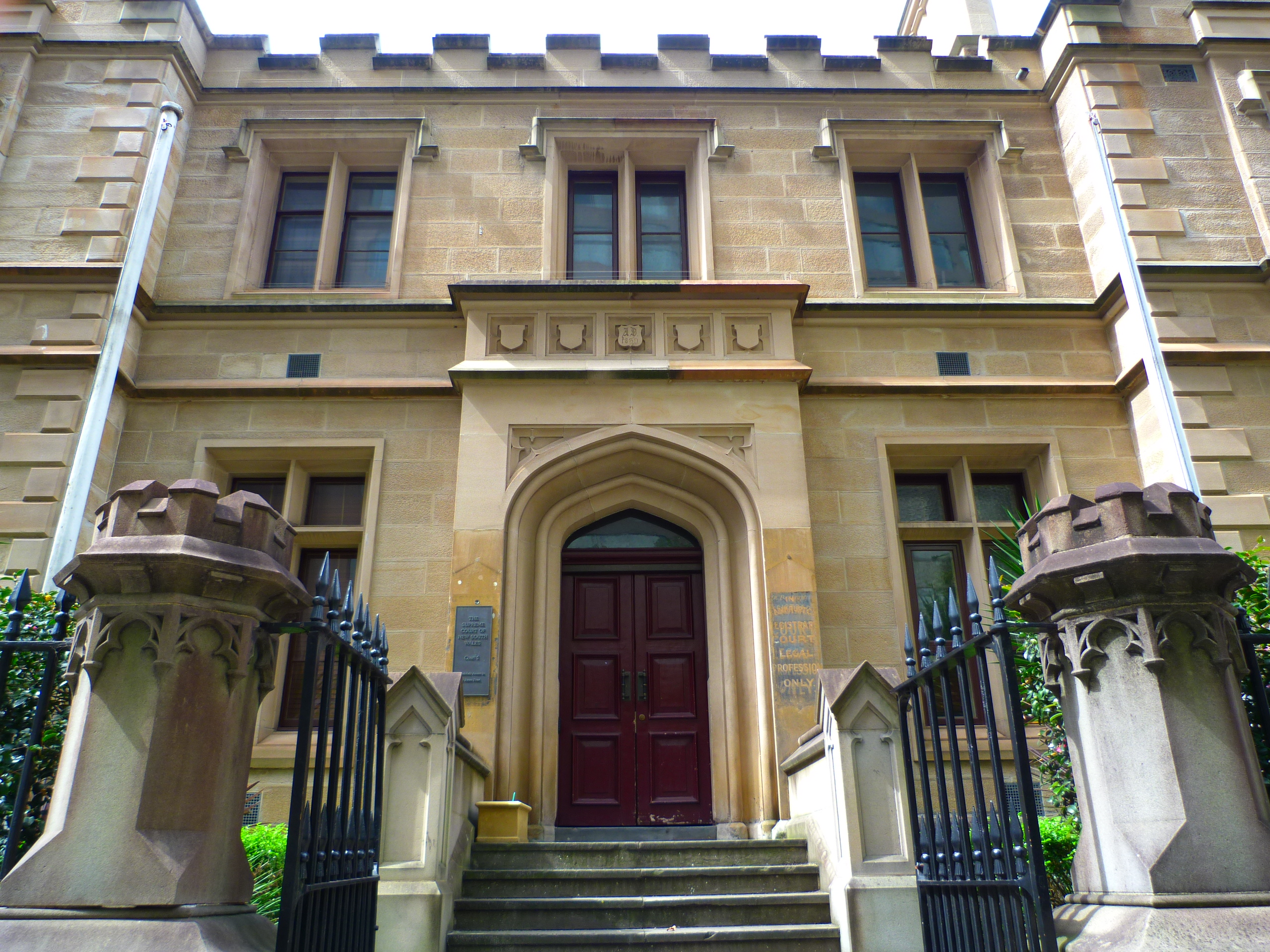
The Supreme Court of New South Wales

The prosecutor produced witnesses in blood, hair, and fingerprints. White's lawyers focused on the fingerprints, attempting to argue they may have appeared on the newspaper innocently at a time prior to the murder. The defence team successfully convinced the court that the blood found in White's discarded van would have been contaminated by the water used to test the sample and that the dog hairs found on Ruiz may have come from any German Shepherd.

White told the court, "I did not kill Vivian. I had no reason to kill her. I am innocent. Thank you".

The judge, Peter Hidden, acknowledged that the case made by the prosecution was circumstantial and that, in isolation, the evidence presented was not compelling. Investigators considered the fingerprint to be the key item of evidence and that everything else in the case was contingent on successfully proving the fingerprint belonged to White and was from the blood of Ruiz. The judge acknowledged that the fingerprint found on the newspaper was that of White and that this evidence was the "centrepiece" of the case against White. The judge stated:

While there is no scientific proof that the substance in which the fingerprints were made was blood, I am satisfied that it was indeed the deceased's blood imprinted on the paper by the accused's left hand at, or about, the time of death. There is force in the Crown Prosecutor's primary submission that to suggest that the sheet of newspaper was forced into the deceased's mouth by someone other than the accused to stretch coincidence beyond its breaking point.

It is implausible enough that an unknown killer would have seized a piece of newspaper which happened to bear a fingerprint of the accused in a substance that looked like blood. That the killer might have seized a piece of newspaper which happened to bear a fingerprint of the accused in the blood of the deceased borders on the absurd. There is no reasonable hypothesis other than that the accused was the killer...

...I am satisfied beyond reasonable doubt that the deceased died at his hand. If it were felt necessary to identify any intermediate fact essential to that conclusion, one is sufficient: that the accused's fingerprint was placed on the piece of newspaper in the course of the incident in which the deceased met her death...from that it follows, as night follows day, that it was the accused who caused her death...Accordingly, I find the accused guilty of murder.

The judge found that White killed Ruiz in a fit of passion. However, what triggered the attack, where Ruiz was murdered, and White's motive remain unknown.

=== Sentencing ===
White was later sentenced to the maximum penalty applicable in New South Wales at the time: 15 years in prison of which he served at least 9 before being eligible for parole.

== Bibliography ==
Academic literature

- Fay, Barry (1998). "The Jane Doe Murder Mystery". Australian Police Journal. 52 (2): 61–101.
- Petraco, Nicholas; Proni, Gloria; Jackiw, Jennifer; Sapse, Anne-Marie (2006). "Amino acid alanine reactivity with the fingerprint reagent ninhydrin. A detailed ab initio computational study". Journal of Forensic Sciences. 51 (6): 1267–1275. doi:10.1111/j.1556-4029.2006.00271.x. PMID 17199612. S2CID 25946518.

Legal cases

- Regina v White [1996] NSWSC 1806, Supreme Court (NSW, Australia)

News articles

- Cornwall, Deborah (14 January 1992a). "Jane Doe kill case to begin". The Sydney Morning Herald – via Newspapers.com.
- Cornwall, Deborah (29 August 1992b). "Murder suspect to fly back". The Sydney Morning Herald – via Newspapers.com.
- Cornwall, Deborah (1 May 1992c). "Jane Doe murder charge". The Sydney Morning Herald – via Newspapers.com.
- Hickman, Brenda (29 April 1992a). "City swoop on murder suspect". Evening Chronicle – via Newspapers.com.
- Hickman, Brenda (30 April 1992b). "Grisly murder stuns Tyneside". Evening Chronicle – via Newspapers.com.
- Jamieson, Tim (30 April 1992). "Nephew arrested". The Journal – via Newspapers.com.
- Papadopoulos, Nick (31 December 1991). "Dead woman's identity a puzzle". The Sydney Morning Herald – via Newspapers.com.
- Papadopoulos, Nick (13 January 1992). "Many callers offer help in Jane Doe mystery". The Sydney Morning Herald – via Newspapers.com.
- Riley, Mark (30 December 1991). "Police checks today in bid to identify body". The Sydney Morning Herald – via Newspapers.com.
- Riley, Mark (11 January 1992a). "Two weeks after her murder, nobody knows who 'Jane Doe' was". The Sydney Morning Herald – via Newspapers.com.
- Riley, Mark (21 January 1992b). "Police find 100 missing girls". The Sydney Morning Herald – via Newspapers.com.
- Tom, Emma (15 September 1992). "No bail for man in Jane Doe case". The Sydney Morning Herald – via Newspapers.com.

Television documentaries

- Liebmann, Steve (2005). Crime Investigation Australia, the body in the bag (Television production). Sydney: Foxtel Productions. OCLC 271558088.
- McCune, Lisa (2005). Forensic Investigators, Jane Doe (Television production). Sydney: Southern Star Productions. OCLC 225192145.
