= John Doe =

Common placeholder name in English

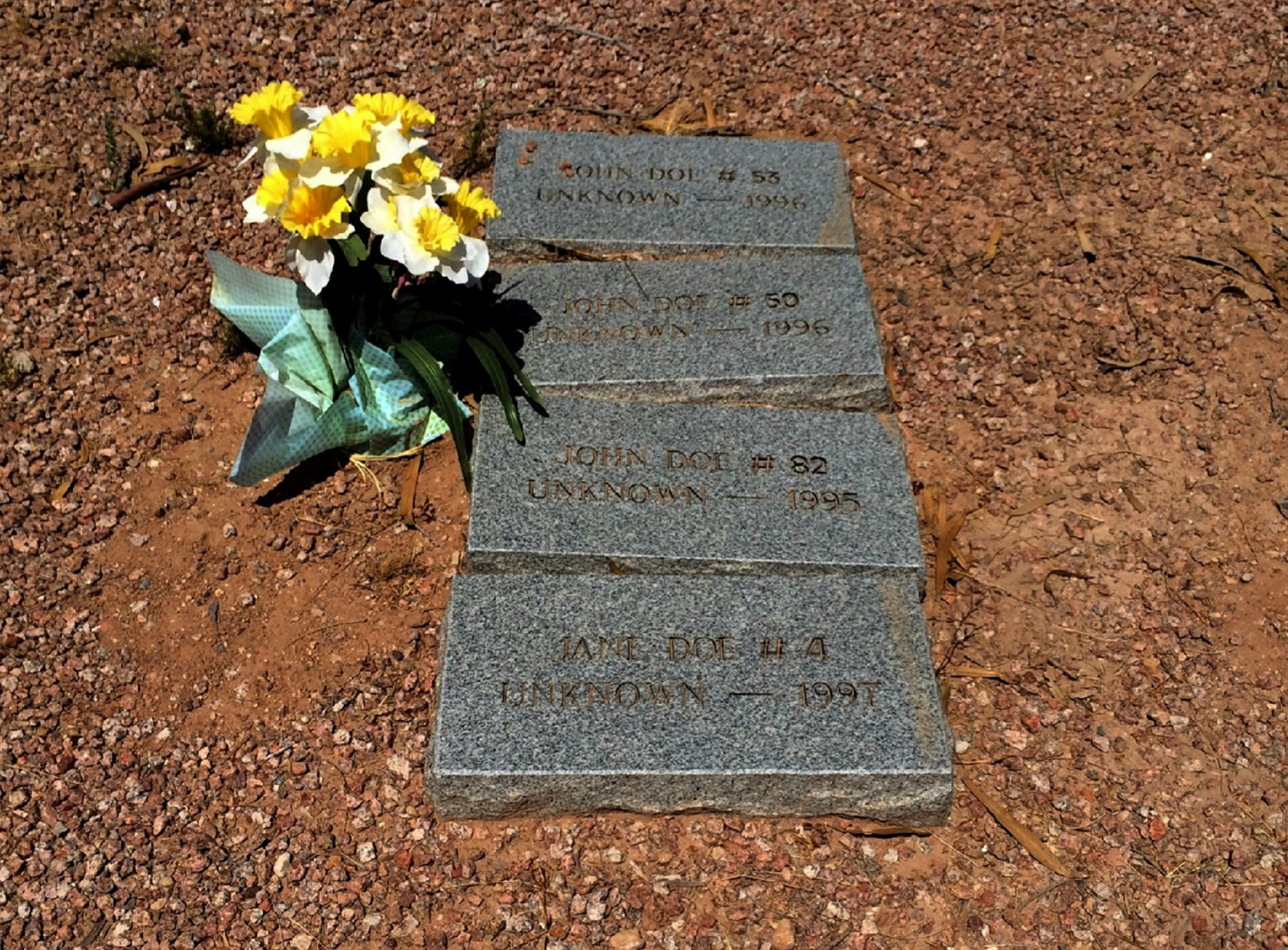
Four headstones marking the single grave of four unknown people in the Pima County Cemetery, Tucson, Arizona. They are called "John Doe" or "Jane Doe" followed by a number sign (#) and a number. In the same cemetery, the murdered Deanna Criswell was called "Jane Doe 19" for 27 years until she was genetically identified in 2015 by her relatives with help from the FBI and The Doe Network.

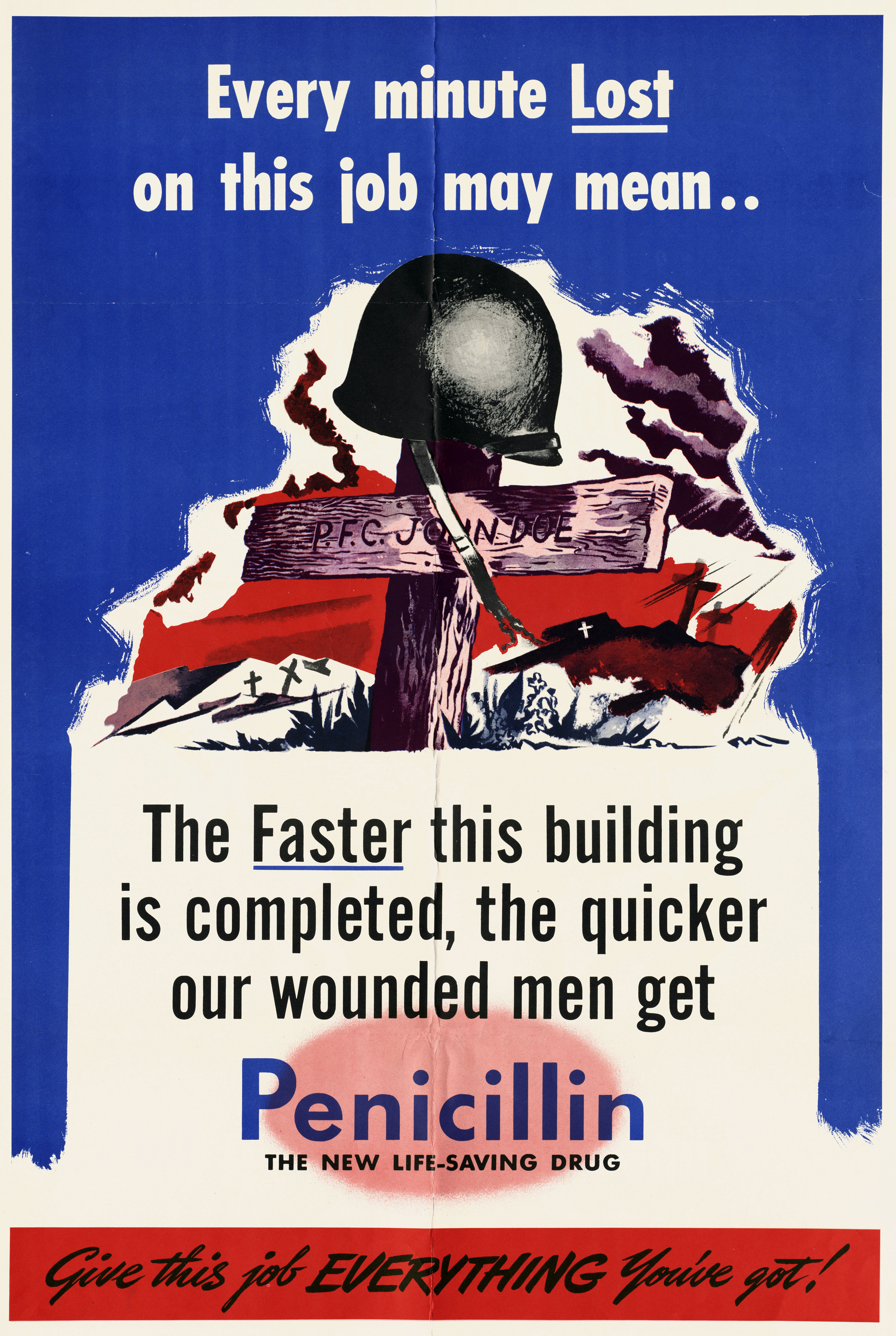
A World War II-era poster from a construction site for a penicillin factory. A military grave labeled "P.F.C. John Doe" emphasizes the importance of the site's completion, as penicillin was a lifesaving drug urgently needed in wartime.

John Doe (male), Jane Doe (female), or J. Doe (neutral/unknown) are multiple-use placeholder names that are used in the British, Canadian, and American legal systems, when the true name of a person is unknown or is being intentionally concealed. In the context of law enforcement in the United States, such names are often used to refer to a corpse whose identity is unknown or cannot be confirmed. These names are also often used to refer to a hypothetical "Everyman" in other contexts, like John Q. Public or "Joe Public". There are many variants to the above names, including John (or Richard)/Jane Roe, John/Jane Smith, Joe/Jane Bloggs, and Johnie/Janie Doe or just Baby Doe for children. The gender-neutral A. N. Other is also a placeholder name, mainly used in the United Kingdom.

== In criminal investigation ==
In other English-speaking countries, unique placeholder names, numbers or codenames have become more often used in the context of police investigations. This has included the United Kingdom, where usage of "John Doe" originated during the Middle Ages. However, the legal term John Doe injunction or John Doe order has survived in English law and other legal systems influenced by it. Other names, such as "Joe Bloggs" or "John Smith", have sometimes been informally used as placeholders for an every-man in the UK, Australia, and New Zealand; however such names are seldom used in legal and/or police circles in the same sense as John Doe.

Well-known legal cases named after placeholders include:

- The landmark 1973 US Supreme Court decisions regarding abortion: Roe v. Wade ("Roe" being a pseudonym) and Doe v. Bolton (1973); and
- The civil cases Doe dem. John Hurrell Luscombe v Yates, Hawker, and Mudge (1822) 5 B. & Ald. 544 (England), McKeogh v. John Doe (Ireland; 2012) and Uber Technologies, Inc. v. Doe I (California, 2015).

In the investigative context, John Doe and Jane Doe are also used as designations for unidentified dead bodies.

== History ==
In the legal terminology of Ancient Rome, the names Numerius Negidius and Aulus Agerius were used for hypothetical defendants and plaintiffs. The names "John Doe" (or "John Doo") and "Richard Roe" (along with "John Roe") were regularly invoked in English legal instruments to satisfy technical requirements governing standing and jurisdiction, beginning perhaps as early as the reign of England's King Edward III (1327–1377). Though the rationale behind the choices of Doe and Roe is unknown, there are many suggested folk etymologies. Other fictitious names for a person involved in litigation in medieval English law were "John Noakes" (or "Nokes") and "John-a-Stiles" (or "John Stiles"). The Oxford English Dictionary states that John Doe is "the name given to the fictitious lessee of the plaintiff, in the (now obsolete in the UK) mixed action of ejectment, the fictitious defendant being called Richard Roe".

This usage is mocked in the 1834 English song "John Doe and Richard Roe":

Two giants live in Britain's land,
John Doe and Richard Roe,
Who always travel hand in hand,
John Doe and Richard Roe.
Their fee-faw-fum's an ancient plan
To smell the purse of an Englishman,
And, 'ecod, they'll suck it all they can,
John Doe and Richard Roe ...

This particular use became obsolete in the U.K. in 1852:

As is well known, the device of involving real people as notional lessees and ejectors was used to enable freeholders to sue the real ejectors. These were then replaced by the fictional characters John Doe and Richard Roe. Eventually the medieval remedies were (mostly) abolished by the Real Property Limitation Act of 1833; the fictional characters of John Doe and Richard Roe by the Common Law Procedure Act 1852; and the forms of action themselves by the Judicature Acts 1873–75.

— Secretary of State for Environment, Food, and Rural Affairs v Meier and others (2009).

In the UK, usage of "John Doe" survives mainly in the form of John Doe injunction or John Doe order (see above).

8.02 If an unknown person has possession of the confidential personal information and is threatening to disclose it, a 'John Doe' injunction may be sought against that person. The first time this form of injunction was used since 1852 in the United Kingdom was in 2005 when lawyers acting for JK Rowling and her publishers obtained an interim order against an unidentified person who had offered to sell chapters of a stolen copy of an unpublished Harry Potter novel to the media.

Unlike the United States, the name "John Doe" does not actually appear in the formal name of the case, for example: X & Y v Persons Unknown [2007] HRLR 4. Well-known cases of unidentified decedents include "Caledonia Jane Doe" (1979), "Princess Doe" (1982), and "Walker County Jane Doe" (1980), all of whom have been identified. In 1997, New York City police discovered a decapitated body and were not able to find the killer. The body was named Peaches and also Jane Doe 3. The baby victim in a 2001 murder case in Kansas City, Missouri, was referred to as Precious Doe.

Example of an ID card with the name John Doe

In 2009, The New York Times reported the difficulties and unwanted attention experienced by a man actually named John Doe, who had often been suspected of using a pseudonym. He had been questioned repeatedly by airport security staff. Another man named John Doe was often suspected of being an incognito celebrity.

== Other variants ==
In cases where a large number of unidentified individuals are mentioned, numbers may be appended, such as "Doe #2" or "Doe II". Operation Delego (2009), which targeted an international child sexual abuse ring, cited 21 numbered "John Does", as well as other people known by the surnames "Doe", "Roe", "Hoe" and "Poe". "John Stiles", "Richard Miles" have been used for the third and fourth participants in an action. "Mary Major" has been used in some federal cases in the US. "James Doe" and "Judy Doe" are among other common variants.

Less often, other surnames ending in -oe have been used when more than two unknown or unidentified persons are named in U.S. court proceedings, e.g.,

- Poe v. Snyder, 834 F.Supp.2d 721 (W. D. Mich. 2011), whose full style is Jane Poe, John Doe, Richard Roe, Robert Roe, Mark Moe, Larry Loe, Degage Ministries, and Mel Trotter Ministries, Plaintiffs, v. Rick Snyder, Governor of the State of Michigan, Bill Schuette, Attorney General of the State of Michigan, Kriste Etue, Director of the Michigan State Police, William Forsyth, Kent County Prosecutor, in their official capacities, Defendants; and
- Friedman v. Ferguson, No. 87-3758, unpublished disposition, 850 F.2d 689 (4th Cir., 29 June 1988), whose full style is Wilbur H. Friedman, Plaintiff-Appellant, v. Thomas B. FERGUSON, Director, Department of Animal Control, a State Actor, In His Official and Individual Capacities; Brett Boe; Carla Coe; Donna Doe; Frank Foe; Grace Goe; Harry Hoe; State Actors, Advisors To Defendant Ferguson, In Their Official and Individual Capacities (identities currently unknown); Marta Moe; Norma Noe; Paula Poe; Ralph Roe; Sammy Soe; Tommy Toe; Private Individuals Who Conspired With the Foregoing State Actors (identities currently unknown); Roger W. Galvin, Chairman, Animal Matters Hearing Board; Vince Voe; William Woe; Xerxes Xoe; Members of the Animal Matters Hearing Board, State Actors, In Their Official and Individual Capacities (identities currently unknown), Defendants-Appellees.

In Massachusetts, "Mary Moe" is used to refer to pregnant girls under the age of 18 petitioning the Superior Court for a judicial bypass exception to the parental consent requirement for abortion. "Mary Moe" is also used to refer to such cases generally, i.e. "Mary Moe cases". Sometimes "Mary Doe" may be used for the individuals. Parallels in other countries include:

- "Ashok Kumar" has been used in court cases in India.
- "X ben X" (lit. 'X, son of X', Arabic: إفلان بن فلان or سين بن سين) is used in Morocco for unidentified bodies, suspects, hospital patients, amnesiacs, homeless people with no identity documents, and orphans.
- the abbreviation N.N., which is commonly used in European legal systems, as an abbreviation for Latin terms nomen nescio ("I do not know the name"), nomen nominandum ("the name must be mentioned"), or nullum nomen ("no name").
- Ploni, Almoni, or Ploni Almoni are used in Israel, the names originating in the Hebrew Bible. Israel Israeli is a newer variant, used in Israel today.

== Famous court cases ==
- The landmark 1973 abortion cases Roe v. Wade and Doe v. Bolton get their names from anonymous plaintiffs later revealed to be, respectively, Norma McCorvey and Sandra Cano.
- A Toronto woman, publicly known only as Jane Doe, waged an 11-year court battle against the Toronto Police Service after being raped in 1986, alleging that the police had used her as bait to catch the Balcony Rapist. She won the case in 1998, and was named Chatelaine's Woman of the Year that year. She published a book about her experience, The Story of Jane Doe: A Book about Rape, in 2003.
- A Doe subpoena is an investigatory tool that a plaintiff may use to seek the identity of an unknown defendant. Doe subpoenas are often served on online service providers and Internet service providers (ISPs) to obtain the identity of the author of an anonymous post.
- Serial killer Richard Laurence Marquette confessed to the murder of an unknown woman identified only as Jane Doe.
- File sharing websites were blocked in India on 21 July 2011 on some ISPs including Bharti Airtel, BSNL, and Reliance Communications, because Reliance BIG Pictures got a "John Doe" order from Delhi High Court allowing them to serve cease and desist notices on people illegally redistributing the film Singham. This allegedly brought down copyright infringement of the film by 30%.
- On 29 August 2011, Reliance Entertainment procured a 'John Doe' order from the Delhi High Court to prevent the illegal broadcast or streaming of its upcoming film Bodyguard. This order gives protection to the intellectual property owner, Reliance Entertainment, from copyright violation by prospective anonymous offenders. The use and selection of pseudonyms is not standardized in U.S. courts. The practice was rare prior to 1969, and is sometimes objected to on legal grounds.

Currently there are no court rules about pseudonym use. The rules of civil procedure ... are silent on the matter ... Rule of Civil Procedure 10(a) reads, '... In the complaint, the title of the action shall include the names of all the parties ...' The rule contains no guidance as to what parties should do to keep their names confidential.

Prior to ... 1969, only one Supreme Court case, three court of appeals' decisions, and one district court decision in the previous quarter-century featured an anonymous individual as the sole or lead plaintiff. Between 1969 and 22 January 1973, the date when the Supreme Court decided Roe and Doe, there were twenty-one district court and two court of appeals decisions featuring anonymous plaintiffs.

- On 18 January 2015, a woman was sexually assaulted on the campus of Stanford University in California. The victim impact statement that the woman, referred to as Emily Doe in court documents, read at her assailant's sentencing hearing the following year went viral, and she was named a "woman of the year" by Glamour magazine. She publicly revealed her real name, Chanel Miller, in 2019.
- On 10 March 2015, HTG Capital Partners LLC filed a federal lawsuit against unnamed "spoofers", whom the suit referred to as John Doe(s), in the hopes of getting a judge to force the Chicago Mercantile Exchange to reveal the names of the firms. HTG said it had found evidence of thousands of such manipulations over 2013 and 2014.
- In November 2016, a woman only identified as "Jane Doe" abandoned plans to go public about allegedly being raped by Donald Trump.
- In October 2017, an unidentified minor Jane Doe detained by U.S. Immigration and Customs Enforcement sued to enjoin the government from obstructing her access to abortion in Garza v. Hargan.
- In March 2021, Justice Molloy of the Ontario Superior Court of Justice named mass murderer and perpetrator of the 2018 Toronto van attack, Alek Minassian, who was seeking notoriety, as John Doe when reading a highly publicized court decision (R. v. Minassian, 2021 ONSC 1258).
- In September 2026, a former student at Cornell University, under the pseudonym Jane Doe, filed a civil lawsuit against the university, its Chi Phi fraternity chapter, seven student members of the fraternity, her sorority Delta Delta Delta, and others alleging that she was drugged and gang-raped by the seven students at the Chi Phi fraternity house in 2024, and that Cornell failed to protect her and punish the alleged perpetrators.

== See also ==
- Average Joe
- Alan Smithee
- Blackacre
- Fictitious defendants
- Foo
- Joe Bloggs
- Joe Shmoe
- Mr. X
- Nomen nescio
- Rudolf Lingens
- The man on the Clapham omnibus
- Tom, Dick and Harry
- List of placeholder names
- Somerton Man
- Murder of Vivianne Ruiz
