= Numeria gens =

Ancient Roman family

The gens Numeria was a minor plebeian family at ancient Rome. Few of its members held any of the higher offices of the Roman state.

== Origin ==
As a nomen, Numerius is comparatively scarce relative to the praenomen Numerius, from which it is derived. Numerius was not a particularly common praenomen, and is widely believed to have been of Sabine or Oscan origin, although despite its scarcity it was widely diffused among the Roman plebeians, and even received limited use by a few patrician families. According to Varro, there was a goddess Numeria, to whom women prayed during childbirth. She was mentioned in the ancient prayers recited by the Pontifex Maximus, and Varro writes that the praenomen Numerius was given to children who were born quickly. As with other gentilicia that share a form with praenomina and cognomina, it is often difficult to determine whether persons named Numerius bore it as a praenomen, nomen, or cognomen.

== Praenomina ==
The Numerii seem to have used a relatively restricted number of praenomina. From extant records and inscriptions, they used primarily Gaius, Marcus, and Publius. A few Numerii are known to have borne different praenomina, including Quintus, Lucius, and Gnaeus. All of these were very common throughout Roman history.

== Members ==
This list includes abbreviated praenomina. For an explanation of this practice, see filiation.

- Numerius, a friend of Marius, who lent him a ship at Ostia, when the general fled Rome after being proscribed by Sulla in 88 BC. There is some uncertainty as to whether Numerius was his nomen, or his praenomen. (Note: It would be unusual to refer to any Roman by praenomen alone, but this was occasionally done with members of the Claudia gens who bore the praenomen Appius, which was rare outside that family, since Appius was typically more distinctive than either a nomen or a cognomen. In theory Numerius could have been treated the same way, although there are no clear examples of it. This may have been Plutarch's intention, however; the Greek writers despaired of the relatively complex and repetitive Roman name.)
- Numerius Numestius, (Note: It is unclear whether Numerius was Numestius' praenomen or nomen. There is an inscription from Paestum mentioning a N(umerius) Numestius Callistratus, AE 2013, 381, perhaps the same as the friend of Atticus and Cicero, in which Numerius appears to be a praenomen; but no other persons named Numestius are found in known inscriptions, so perhaps that was a cognomen, and Numerius his nomen gentilicium.) a friend of Atticus, who recommended Numestius to Cicero.
- Quintus Numerius Rufus, tribune of the plebs in 57 BC, opposed the recall of Cicero from exile. Cicero thought that Numerius, whom he derisively refers to as Gracchus, had been bribed by his enemies, and states that they considered murdering Numerius in order to place the orator's friends under suspicion.
- Numerius Atticus, a senator of praetorian rank, following the death of Augustus, reported seeing the emperor ascending to the heavens. (Note: Atticus may intentionally have been identifying Augustus with Romulus, the legendary founder and first King of Rome. According to Livy (i. 16), after the death of Romulus, a man named Proculus Julius claimed to have witnessed the king descending from the heavens, urging his people not to fear, and proclaiming the future glory of the city.)
- Lucius Numerius Albanus, tribunus cohortis in AD 113.
- Gaius Numerius Major, a decurion buried at Amisos in Pontus and Bithynia.
- Gaius Numerius C. f. Major, son of the Decurion, who erected a monument in honour of his father.
- Gaius Numerius, the former master of Agathemerus and Epaphroditus; his wife may have been named Licinia, since her freedwoman was named Licinia Pithane.
- Gaius Numerius C. l. Agathemerus, a freedman of Gaius Numerius and his wife, mentioned in an inscription from Rome.
- Gaius Numerius C. l. Epaphroditus, a freedman of Gaius Numerius and his wife, mentioned in an inscription from Rome, together with Epaphroditus' wife, Licinia Pithane, freedwoman of Gaius Numerius' wife.
- Quintus Numerius Germanus, named in an inscription from Poetovio in Pannonia Superior.
- Gnaeus Numerius Cn. f. Fronto, a cavalry veteran of the eighth legion, buried at Altinum in Venetia et Histria.
- Gnaeus Numerius Cn. f. Felix, freedman of Gnaeus Numerius Fronto, also buried at Altinum.
- Marcus Numerius Martialis, one of the heirs of Helvia Valeria, buried at Nemausus in Gallia Narbonensis.
- Marcus Numerius Maximinus, the husband of Maximia Nigella, buried at Nemausus.
- Publius Numerius Martialis Astigitanus, a native and municipal official of Astigi in Hispania Baetica, named in connection with a transaction for one hundred pounds of silver, and as a donor to the public works.
- Publius Numerius Achilles Astigitanus, perhaps a freedman, buried at Astigi, aged ninety-eight.
- Marcus Numerius Priscianus, named in a list of soldiers from the fifth cohort at Rome, dating to the beginning of the second century.
- Quintus Numerius Q. f. Rufus, contributed to the building of a portico at Issa in Dalmatia.
- Gaius Numerius Victor, mentioned in a funerary inscription from Lambaesis in Numidia.
- Marcus Numerius, named in an inscription from Lambaesis.
- Numerius Albanus, governor of Lusitania in AD 336.

== See also ==
- List of Roman gentes
- Carus, Roman emperor who may have been part of the gens
- Carinus, Roman emperor and Carus' elder son
- Numerian, Roman emperor and Carus' younger son

== Bibliography ==
- Marcus Tullius Cicero, Pro Sestio.
- Titus Livius (Livy), Ab Urbe Condita (History of Rome).
- Quintus Asconius Pedianus, Commentarius in Oratio Ciceronis Pro Sestio (Commentary on Cicero's Oration Pro Sestio).
- Plutarchus, Lives of the Noble Greeks and Romans.
- Gaius Suetonius Tranquillus, De Vita Caesarum (Lives of the Caesars, or The Twelve Caesars).
- Lucius Cassius Dio Cocceianus (Cassius Dio), Roman History.
- Scholia Bobiensa (Bobbio Scholiast), Pro Sestio.
- Dictionary of Greek and Roman Biography and Mythology, William Smith, ed., Little, Brown and Company, Boston (1849).
- Theodor Mommsen et alii, Corpus Inscriptionum Latinarum (The Body of Latin Inscriptions, abbreviated CIL), Berlin-Brandenburgische Akademie der Wissenschaften (1853–present).
- René Cagnat et alii, L'Année épigraphique (The Year in Epigraphy, abbreviated AE), Presses Universitaires de France (1888–present).
- George Davis Chase, "The Origin of Roman Praenomina", in Harvard Studies in Classical Philology, vol. VIII (1897).
- Paul von Rohden, Elimar Klebs, & Hermann Dessau, Prosopographia Imperii Romani (The Prosopography of the Roman Empire, abbreviated PIR), Berlin (1898).
- T. Robert S. Broughton, The Magistrates of the Roman Republic, American Philological Association (1952).
