= Joe Public =

Joe Public may refer to:

- Joe Public, a generic name used to denote a hypothetical "common man" in the United Kingdom, known as John Q. Public in the United States
- Joe Public (band), a new jack swing musical group
  - Joe Public (album), the debut album by the new jack swing group
- Joe Public F.C., a football (soccer) club based in Tunapuna, Trinidad and Tobago
- "Joe Public", a song by The Rutles on their album Archaeology (album)
- Joe Public, a metahuman vigilante from DC Comics who gained his powers during comic book story arc Bloodlines
