= People's Defense Force =

People's Defense Force may refer to:

- People's Defense Force (comics), two fictional organizations appearing in comic books by Marvel Comics
- People's Defence Force (Grenada), the army of Grenada prior to the U.S.-led invasion of 1983
- People's Defense Force (Myanmar), the armed wing of the National Unity Government, a Burmese government in exile
- People's Defence Force (Singapore), a civil reserve element of the Singapore Armed Forces
- Tanzania People's Defence Force, the armed forces of Tanzania
- Uganda People's Defence Force, the armed forces of Uganda
- People's Defence Forces, the military wing of the Kurdistan Workers' Party

== See also ==
- Gana Suraksha Party (lit. 'People's Defence Party'), political party in India
