= Lady X =

Lady X may refer to:

- Another stage name of American professional wrestler Peggy Lee Leather
- Recurring character in 1960 Franco-Belgian comic book series Buck Danny
- Character in 2004 fighting game Rumble Roses
- Antagonist of 2012 American animated film Foodfight!

== See also ==
- The Divorce of Lady X, 1938 British comedy film
- Miss X (disambiguation)
- Madame X (disambiguation)
