= Doctor X =

Doctor X may refer to:

- Doctor X (film), a 1932 Technicolor film starring Lee Tracy, Fay Wray and Lionel Atwill
- Doctor X (play), play by Howard W Comstock and Allen C. Miller
- Alan E. Nourse, who used "Doctor X" as the pseudonym of his 1965 journal Intern
- Doctor X (wrestler), ring name of Mexican professional wrestler Clemente Valencia
- "Doctor X", a ring name of professional wrestler Dick Beyer
- "Doctor X", a ring name of professional wrestler Tom Prichard
- Dr. X (Action Man), the arch-enemy of the 1993–2006 Action Man revival toy line
- Dr. X, a pseudonym for Doctor Mario Jascalevich, accused of several patient murders
- Dr. X, the primary antagonist of the Queensryche albums Operation: Mindcrime and Operation: Mindcrime 2
- Dr. X, a mysterious illicit nanotechnology specialist from Neal Stephenson's novel The Diamond Age
- Doctor-X: Surgeon Michiko Daimon, a Japanese medical drama
  - Doctor X: Mafia in White, a South Korean medical noir adaptation
- Ted Mosby, How I Met Your Mother character whose aliases include Doctor X

== See also ==
- Mister X (disambiguation)
