= Benchling =

American software company

Benchling, Inc.
- Type: Private
- Industry: Software
- Founded: 2012; 14 years ago
- Headquarters: San Francisco, California, United States
- Key people: Sajith Wickramasekara (Co-founder and CEO); Ashu Singhal (Co-founder and President); Cory Li (Co-founder)
- Number of employees: 810 (2026)
- Website: benchling.com

Benchling, Inc. is an American software company that develops electronic lab notebook, lab management, and cloud computing software for use in life sciences and biotechnology R&D.

== History ==
Benchling was founded in 2012 by MIT students Sajith Wickramasekara, Ashu Singhal, and Cory Li. Having received enthusiastic feedback from researchers at MIT and Stanford on prototypes of software for designing and analyzing CRISPR gene editing experiments, Benchling's co-founders participated in the summer 2012 batch of Y Combinator. The company raised a $7 million Series A in 2016, a $14.5 million Series B in 2018, a $34.5 million Series C in 2019, a $50 million Series D in 2020, a $200 million Series E in 2021, and a $100 million Series F in 2021 that valued the company at $6.1 billion. Benchling filed Form S-1 with the U.S. Securities and Exchange Commission in November 2021, but as of 2026 had not yet completed an initial public offering.

Benchling's headquarters are located in the SoMa neighborhood of San Francisco, and its East Coast office is located in Boston. In 2021, the company established its EMEA headquarters in Zurich, Switzerland. In 2022, the company added an office in Belfast, United Kingdom via its acquisition of Belfast-based startup Overwatch Research.

As of 2025, Benchling is used by more than 200,000 scientists at more than 1,300 companies and 7,500 academic institutions worldwide. Much of its software is offered free of charge for academic use. The company's annual recurring revenue is estimated to be more than $200 million.
