= Miss X =

Miss X may refer to:

- Miss X (character), a character in the DC Comics universe
- Miss X and Miss Z, characters from the animated television series Johnny Test
- Miss XV, a Mexican television series
- Miss X, the one-time recording alias of Joyce Blair
- Miss X, an alias of Iori Yagami in SNK Gals' Fighters and SNK Heroines: Tag Team Frenzy
- Miss X, the pseudonym of American medium Ada Goodrich Freer

== See also ==
- Mister X (disambiguation)
- Mrs. X (character)
- Madame X (disambiguation)
- Lady X (disambiguation)
- X (disambiguation)
