= Numerius Negidius =

Name used in hypothetical lawsuits in Ancient Rome

Numerius Negidius is a name used in Roman jurisprudence to refer to the defendant in a hypothetical lawsuit. It based on a play on words: Numerius is a Roman praenomen, or forename, resembling the verb numero, "I pay"; while Negidius has the form of a gentile name formed from the verb nego, "I refuse". Thus, Numerius Negidius is a personal name that can also be interpreted to mean "he who refuses to pay".

The plaintiff would be referred to as Aulus Agerius. Aulus is also a praenomen, while Agerius suggests the Latin verb ago, "I set in motion", as it is the plaintiff who initiates a lawsuit.

One well-known legal formula, a model instruction to the judge in a civil lawsuit, began as follows: si paret Numerium Negidium Aulo Agerio sestertium decem milia dare oportere, meaning, "if it appears that Numerius Negidius ought to pay Aulus Agerius ten thousand sesterces..." In actual use, the names and amounts would be changed to the appropriate values. This formula appears several times in Book IV of Gaius' Institutiones (c. AD 161).

The initials N. N. can also stand for "name unknown" (nomen nescio), a placeholder name roughly equivalent to John or Jane Doe, Thomas Atkins, etc.
