= Citizens' Defence Force =

The Citizens' Defence Force (1922) was a unit of former British Army soldiers and Irish Volunteers organised by Ireland as a semi-secret group of about 100 operatives. It was financed from the Secret Service budget to mount foot patrols and gather intelligence, and was eventually absorbed into the CID (Criminal Investigation Department).
