= Comrades (1919 film) =

1919 film directed by Johannes Guter

- Directed by: Johannes Guter
- Written by: August Strindberg (play)
- Distributed by: UFA
- Release date: October 1919
- Country: Germany
- Languages: Silent; German intertitles

Comrades (German: Kameraden) is a 1919 German silent film directed by Johannes Guter. It is based on the play Marauders by August Strindberg.

== Plot ==
Axel and Bertha are a modern, emancipated artist couple in Paris. He is feminine and vain. She is financially independent, a member of the women's association "Married's Women's right of ownership" and uses male nude models.

== Cast ==
- Alfred Abel as Maler Axel
- Harriet Bosse as Bertha
- Eva Everth as Frau Stark
- Ernst Laskowski as Leutnant Stark
- Willy Schröder as Doktor Östermark
- Lotte Stein as Berthas Freundin Abel
- Hermine Straßmann-Witt as Frau halol
- Hans Walden as Schriftsteller Willmer

== Bibliography ==
- Bock, Hans-Michael; Bergfelder, Tim, eds. (2009). The Concise Cinegraph: Encyclopaedia of German Cinema. New York: Berghahn Books. ISBN 978-1-57181-655-9.
