= The Masses (disambiguation) =

The Masses is a magazine of socialist politics published on monthly in the U.S. from 1911 until 1917.

The Masses may also refer to:

- Commoners, the main toiling part of a population
- The Masses (Egyptian newspaper), a communist weekly newspaper
- The Masses (Thai newspaper), a communist weekly newspaper
- The Masses (collective), a visual arts, movie, and music collective

== See also ==
- Mass (disambiguation)
- Multitude (disambiguation)
