= Professor X (disambiguation) =

Professor X is a Marvel Comics superhero.

Professor X may also refer to:

- Professor X the Overseer, hip hop activist, leader of the Blackwatch Movement, and member of the group X-Clan, born Lumumba Carson
- Arabian Prince, rapper and hip hop producer, also known as Professor X
- Professor X, a 1940s Captain Flight Comics comic-book character
- Professor X, pseudonymous author of In the Basement of the Ivory Tower
