= The Unknown Citizen =

1939 poem by W. H. Auden

"The Unknown Citizen" is a poem written by W. H. Auden in 1939, shortly after he moved from England to the United States. The poem was first published on 6 January 1940 in The New Yorker, and first appeared in book form in Auden's collection Another Time (Random House, 1940).

The poem is the epitaph of a man identified only by a combination of letters and numbers, JS/07/M/378, who is described entirely in external terms: from the point of view of government organizations such as the fictional "Bureau of Statistics." The speaker of the poem concludes that the man had lived an entirely average, therefore exemplary, life. The poem is a satire of standardization at the expense of individualism. The poem is implicitly the work of a government agency at some point in the future, when modern bureaucratizing trends have reached the point where citizens are known by arbitrary numbers and letters, not personal names.

== Interpretation ==
By describing the "average citizen" through the eyes of various government organizations, the poem criticizes standardization and the modern state's relationship with its citizens. The last lines of the poem dismiss the questions of whether he was "free" or "happy," implicitly because the 'statistical method' strategy used by the state to judge his life cannot understand such questions. The manipulative state described in the poem finds the Unknown Citizen to be an ideal one.

The epigraph to "The Unknown Citizen" is a parody of the symbolic Tomb of the Unknown Soldier commemorating unidentified soldiers; tombs of unknown soldiers were first created following the first World War.

It is not just government organizations that Auden criticizes. His employer is "satisfied," his union "reports he paid his dues", his mates are found to like him, and the press are pleased with his buying papers daily and responding to the ads. The industry poll takers are happy with his buying habits, and teachers are glad he stayed out of their way. In Auden's poem, the entire system and society are responsible for the loss of individualism, whether or not government was the initial cause of the decline.
