= Cushing Citizen =

Community newspaper of Cushing, Oklahoma, USA

- Type: Weekly newspaper
- Format: Broadsheet
- Owner(s): J. D. and MaryLee Meisner
- Publisher: J. D. Meisner
- Editor: Allie Prater
- Founded: 1895
- Language: English
- Headquarters: 120 E Broadway; Cushing, Oklahoma 74023; United States
- Country: United States
- Circulation: 2,000
- Sister newspapers: Keystone Gusher, Yale News
- ISSN: 1096-6560
- Website: cushingcitizen.com

The Cushing Citizen is a newspaper founded in 1895 as the community newspaper of local town Cushing, Oklahoma. Through the years the newspaper has had numerous owners including O.H. and Hattie Mae Lachenmeyer. In the past the paper has been issued weekly and then daily. It is currently published once weekly by J.D. and Marylee Meisner, who purchased the Citizen in February 2020 from David and Myra Reid.

The Reid couple purchased the Cushing Daily Citizen from Francis Stipe in 1992. The Reids sold the newspaper to CNHI in 1997. CNHI sold the Cushing Daily Citizen alongside two other newspapers to the Sumner family of Sapulpa in October of 2007. As part of the transaction the Cushing paper was also sold to the Reids, who previously sold it to CNHI 10 years prior.

The paper became a weekly in print in January of 2018 and has remained such since. An online "Weekender" edition was also added in 2018 which has since been converted into a free, fully online lifestyle and entertainment magazine known as "Cimarron Valley Weekender" .

The Reids sold the Citizen in February of 2020, to Cimarron Valley Communications, LLC, owned by J. D. and MaryLee Meisner. Cimarron Valley Communications is the umbrella company to the newspapers; Cushing Citizen, The Keystone Gusher, and Yale News in Oklahoma. It also oversees and maintains the kids' page SMARTYPANTS and TrashPanda digital.
