= List of English-language placeholder names for people =

A variety of placeholder names are used in the English language, some with respect to the average unnamed person, and some with specialized meanings such as reference to people in particular professions. Some morphologists "will distinguish between placeholders such as thingummy and placeholder names like John Doe".

== Common names ==
=== A. N. Other ===
A. N. Other is used as a placeholder name or, less commonly, used as a pseudonym by a person wishing to remain anonymous. It is most used in the United Kingdom, often written as AN Other. Occasionally it may be abbreviated to ANO, or—in cases where a female name is expected—rendered as Ann(e) Other. These various uses evoke the phrase, "an other", or the word, "another". A similarly constructed placeholder name, U. N. Owen, invokes the word "unknown".

As a placeholder name, A. N. Other is commonly employed in lists of cricket players, where players' names are traditionally listed as initials and surname (e.g., I. T. Botham), for players whose names have not yet been announced or are unknown (e.g. "Additional players: A. W. Smith, J. C. Taylor and A. N. Other").

The Formula One racing driver Jackie Stewart raced as "A. N. Other" early in his career, supposedly because his mother would worry if she knew he was racing cars.

=== Alan Smithee ===
Alan Smithee (also Allen Smithee) is an official pseudonym used by film directors who wish to disown a project. Coined by the Directors Guild of America in 1968, it was used until 2000 when it was largely discontinued. It was the sole pseudonym used by DGA members who were, on paper, directors of a film but were dissatisfied with the final product and able to prove to a guild panel that they had not been able to exercise creative control over its filming process. The director was also required by guild rules not to discuss the circumstances leading to the move or even to acknowledge being the project's director. The Alan Smithee credit has also been adopted for direction credit disputes in television, music videos and other media.

=== Alice and Bob ===
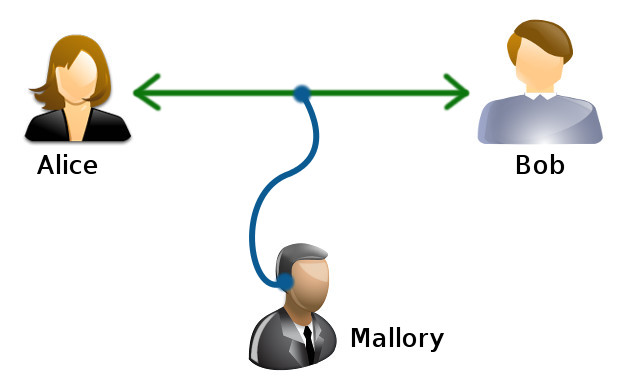
Example scenario where communication between Alice and Bob is intercepted by Mallory

An example of an "Alice and Bob" used in cryptography

Alice and Bob are fictional characters commonly used as placeholders in discussions about cryptographic systems and protocols, and in other science and engineering literature where there are several participants in a thought experiment. The Alice and Bob characters were created by Ron Rivest, Adi Shamir, and Leonard Adleman in their 1978 paper "A Method for Obtaining Digital Signatures and Public-key Cryptosystems". Subsequently, they have become common archetypes in many scientific and engineering fields, such as quantum cryptography, game theory and physics. As the use of Alice and Bob became more widespread, additional characters were added, sometimes each with a particular meaning. These characters do not have to refer to people; they refer to generic agents which might be different computers or even different programs running on a single computer.

The names, Alice and Bob, are used for convenience and to aid comprehension. For example, "How can Bob send a private message M to Alice in a public-key cryptosystem?" is believed to be easier to describe and understand than if the hypothetical people were simply named A and B as in "How can B send a private message M to A in a public-key cryptosystem?" The names are conventional, and where relevant may use an alliterative mnemonic such as "Mallory" for "malicious" to associate the name with the typical role of that person. The choice of these names may have come from the film Bob & Carol & Ted & Alice.

=== Babyboy and Babygirl ===
"Babyboy" and "Babygirl" are traditionally used as placeholder names by medical personnel for unnamed or unidentified infants placed in their care, usually with the surname of the mother if known, such as "Babyboy Johnson" or "Babygirl Smith". A 2003 journal article and a 2015 news report noted that hospitals using a standard "Babyboy" or "Babygirl" placeholder for the first names of unidentified newborns has led to mix-ups in identification and medication of the infants. The journal article noted the tendency of temporary names not to be transferred from one data system to another, causing a break in information.

=== Fnu Lnu ===
"Fnu Lnu" is used by authorities to identify unknown suspects, the name being an acronym for First Name Unknown, Last Name Unknown. If a person's first name is known but not the last, or vice versa, they may be called [real name] Lnu or Fnu [real name], and an unidentified person may be Fnu Lnu. For example, a former interpreter for the United States military was charged as "FNU LNU", and a mute man whose identity could not be determined was arrested and charged with burglary in Harris County, Texas under the name "FNU-LNU" (charges were later dropped because authorities could not communicate with the man). Fnu-Lnu conjunctions may also be used if the person has only a single name, as in Indonesian names. The name has been considered a source of humor when Fnu Lnu has been mistaken for the actual name of a person.

=== Fred Bloggs or Joe Bloggs ===
Joe Bloggs and Fred Bloggs are placeholder names used primarily in the United Kingdom to represent a typical or hypothetical man, similar to John Doe in the United States.

The surnames Blogg/Bloggs/Bloke are believed to have originated in the East Anglian region of Britain, Norfolk or Suffolk, deriving from bloc, "pale, fair, shining".

In The Princeton Review standardised test preparation courses, "Joe Bloggs" represents the average test-taker, and students are trained to identify the "Joe Bloggs answer", or the choice which seems right but may be misleading on harder questions.

"Joe Bloggs" was a brand name for a clothing range, especially baggy jeans, which was closely associated with the Madchester scene of the 1990s.

=== G.I. Joe ===
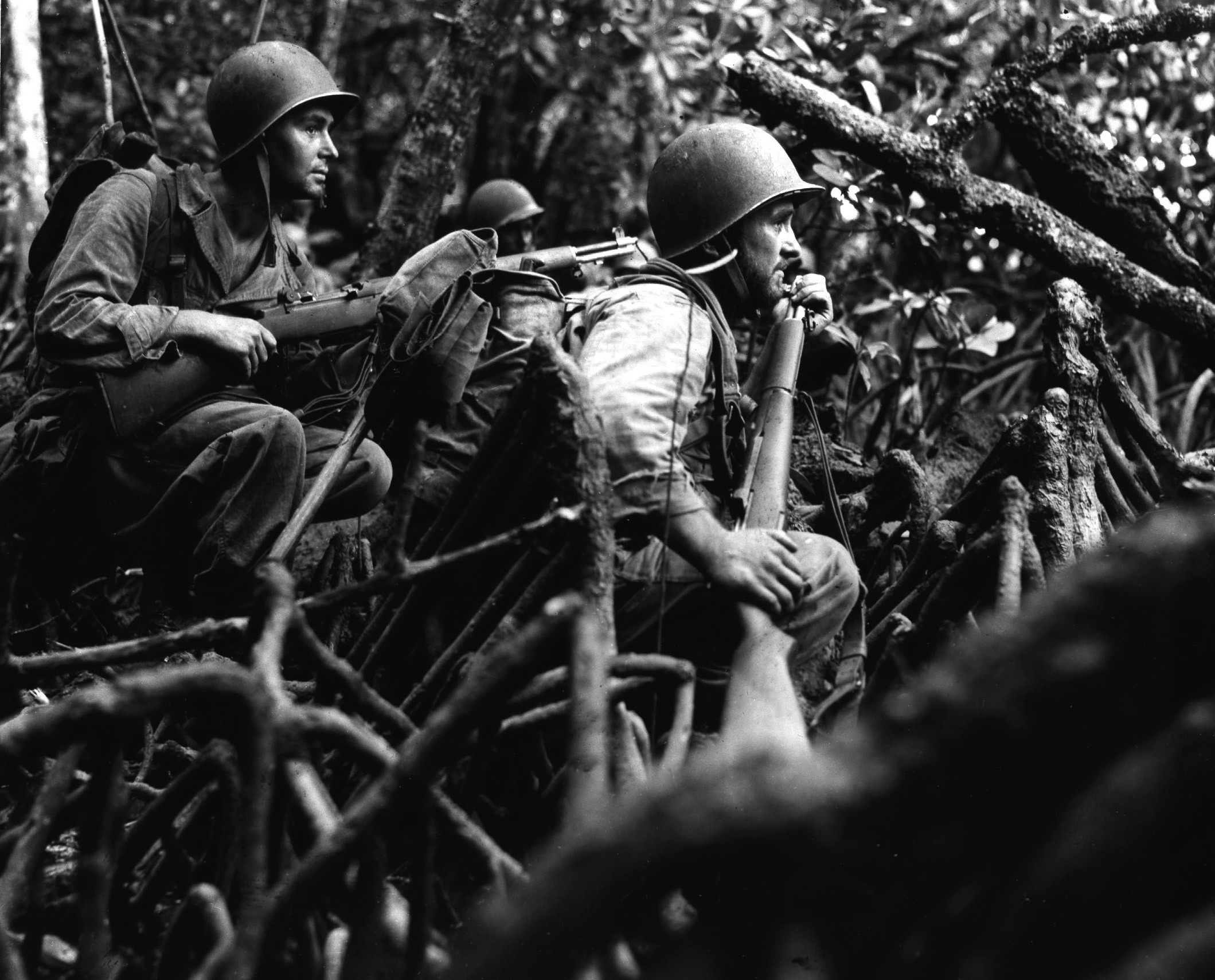
G.I.s from the 25th Infantry Division in the jungle of Vella Lavella during Operation Cartwheel, 13 September 1943

G.I. is an informal term which refers to members of the United States Armed Forces, in particular the United States Army. It is most deeply associated with World War II and the Korean War, but continues to see use, for instance in the G.I. Joe comics, films, and toys franchise. It was originally an initialism used in U.S. Army paperwork for items made of galvanized iron. The earliest known instance in writing is from either 1906 or 1907. During World War I, U.S. soldiers took to referring to heavy German artillery shells as "G.I. cans". During the same war, "G.I.", reinterpreted as "government issue" or "general issue", began being used to refer to any item associated with the U.S. Army, e.g., "G.I. soap". Other reinterpretations of "G.I." include "garrison issue" and "general infantry".

The earliest known recorded instances of "G.I." being used to refer to an American enlisted man as a slang term are from 1935. In the form of "G.I. Joe" it was made better known due to it being taken as the title of a comic strip by Dave Breger in Yank, the Army Weekly, beginning in 1942. A 1944 radio drama, They Call Me Joe, reached a much broader audience. It featured a different individual each week, thereby emphasizing that "G.I. Joe" encompassed U.S. soldiers of all ethnicities. They Call Me Joe reached civilians across the U.S. via the NBC Radio Network and U.S. soldiers via the Armed Forces Radio Network. Dwight D. Eisenhower would notably reference the term "G.I. Joe," whom he described as the main hero of World War II, in his May 1945 Victory in Europe Day address. "G.I. Jane" originally referred to a member of the Women's Army Corps during World War II, but more recently it is used to refer to any female American soldier.

=== J. Random Hacker ===
In computer slang, J. Random Hacker is an arbitrary programmer (hacker).

A mythical figure like the Unknown Soldier; the archetypal hacker nerd. This term is one of the oldest in the hacker's jargon, apparently going back to MIT in the 1960s. may originally have been inspired by 'J. Fred Muggs', a show-biz chimpanzee whose name was a household word back in the early days of TMRC, and was probably influenced by 'J. Presper Eckert' (one of the co-inventors of the electronic computer)".

— "A Portrait of J. Random Hacker", the Jargon File

Usage examples may be found in The Art of Unix Programming by Eric S. Raymond and Beginning Python, by Peter Norton et al. J. Random Hacker is the pen name of the author of a book about ease of malicious hacking, Adventures of a Wi-Fi Pirate. Also, jrandom was an anonymous main developer of I2P software.

=== Joe Shmoe ===
Joe Shmoe (also spelled Joe Schmoe and Joe Schmo; for which Joe Blow is sometimes substituted), meaning "Joe Anybody", or no one in particular, is a commonly used fictional name in American English. Adding a "Shm" to the beginning of a word is meant to diminish, negate, or dismiss an argument (for instance, "Rain, shmain, we've got a game to play"). It can also indicate that the speaker is being ironic or sarcastic. This process was adapted in English from the use of the "schm" prefix in Yiddish to dismiss something; as in, "sale, schmale" (thus denying that the sale is worthwhile). While "schmo" ("schmoo", "schmoe") is thought by some linguists to be a clipping of Yiddish שמאָק "schmuck", that derivation is disputed. The earliest known use of the phrase is the 1940s.

=== John Doe and Jane Doe ===
John Doe (male) or Jane Doe (female) are used in the British, Canadian, and American legal systems for unidentified deceased persons, anonymous victims, or defendants whose real identities are hidden or unconfirmed. or for privacy reasons. In the context of law enforcement in the United States, such names are often used to refer to a corpse whose identity is unknown or cannot be confirmed. These names are also often used to refer to a hypothetical "everyman" in other contexts. There are many variants to the above names, including John (or Richard)/Jane Roe, John/Jane Smith, Joe/Jane Bloggs, and Johnie/Janie Doe or just Baby Doe for children.

In other English-speaking countries, unique placeholder names, numbers or codenames have become more often used in the context of police investigations. This has included the United Kingdom, where usage of "John Doe" originated during the Middle Ages. However, the legal term John Doe injunction or John Doe order has survived in English law and other legal systems influenced by it. Other names have sometimes been informally used as placeholders for an every-man in the UK, Australia, and New Zealand; however such names are seldom used in legal and/or police circles in the same sense as John Doe.

In the legal terminology of Ancient Rome, the names Numerius Negidius and Aulus Agerius were used for hypothetical defendants and plaintiffs. The names "John Doe" (or "John Doo") and "Richard Roe" (along with "John Roe") were regularly invoked in English legal instruments to satisfy technical requirements governing standing and jurisdiction, beginning perhaps as early as the reign of England's King Edward III (1327–1377). Though the rationale behind the choices of Doe and Roe is unknown, there are many suggested folk etymologies. Other fictitious names for a person involved in litigation in medieval English law were "John Noakes" (or "Nokes") and "John-a-Stiles" (or "John Stiles"). The Oxford English Dictionary states that John Doe is "the name given to the fictitious lessee of the plaintiff, in the (now obsolete in the UK) mixed action of ejectment, the fictitious defendant being called Richard Roe".

=== John Q. Public ===
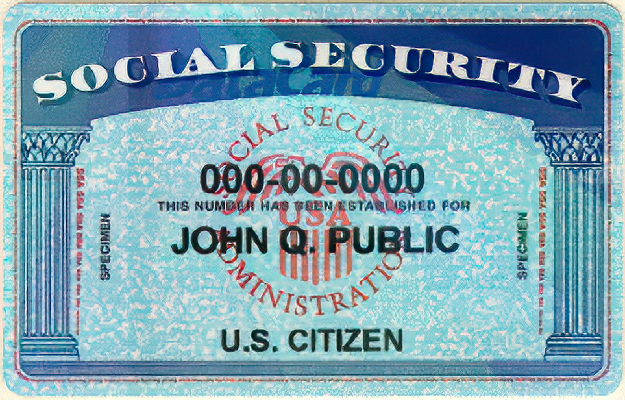
Social Security card featuring John Q. Public

John Q. Public (and several similar names) are used especially in American English to denote a hypothetical member of society, deemed a "common man", who is presumed to represent the randomly selected "man on the street".

Various similar terms exist, including John Q. Citizen, Joe Public and John Q. Taxpayer, or Jane Q. Public, Jane Q. Citizen, and Jane Q. Taxpayer for a woman.

John, Quisquam, and "The Public" first appeared in the formation of the United States in the late 1700s. Many new Americans of Lutheran German heritage also spoke Latin and used the term "quisquam" with a gender-neutral meaning of "anyone", while in English, John was the generic male term for a person.

The term John Q. Public was the name of a character created by Vaughn Shoemaker, an editorial cartoonist for the Chicago Daily News, in 1922. Jim Lange, the editorial cartoonist for The Oklahoman for 58 years, was closely identified with a version of the John Q. Public character, whom he sometimes also called "Mr. Voter". Lange's version of the character was described as "bespectacled, mustachioed, fedora-wearing". In 2006, the Oklahoma State Senate voted to make this character the "state's official editorial cartoon." 2008 Republican Vice Presidential nominee Sarah Palin referred to "Joe Sixpack and Hockey moms" during a debate. Presidential candidate John McCain referenced a similar symbol, this time represented by an actual person, saying that Senator Obama's tax plan would hurt Joe the Plumber's bottom line. A fifteen-minute debate on this issue ensued, with both candidates speaking directly to "Joe".

=== Nomen nescio ===
Nomen nescio (pronounced [ˈnoːmɛn ˈnɛskɪ.oː]), abbreviated to N.N., is used to signify an anonymous or unnamed person. From Latin nomen – "name", and nescio – "I do not know", it literally means "I do not know the name". The generic name Numerius Negidius used in Roman times was chosen partly because it shared initials with this phrase. It is sometimes attributed to the phrase "no name".

One use for this name is to protect against retaliation when reporting a crime or company fraud. In the Netherlands, a police suspect who refuses to give his name is given an "N.N. number." In Germany and Belgium, N.N. is also frequently seen in university course lists, indicating that a course will take place but that the lecturer is not yet known; the abbreviation in this case means nomen nominandum – "the name is to be announced". Thus, the meaning is different from the above definition and is the same as TBD (to be decided).

N. N. is commonly used in the scoring of chess games, not only when one participant's name is genuinely unknown but when an untitled player faces a master, as in a simultaneous exhibition. Genealogists often use the abbreviation to signify an unknown or partially unknown name (such as N.N. Jones).

=== T. C. Mits ===
T. C. Mits (acronym for "the celebrated man in the street") is a term coined by Lillian Rosanoff Lieber to refer to an everyman. In Lieber's works, T. C. Mits was a character who made scientific topics more approachable to the public audience. The phrase has enjoyed sparse use by authors in fields such as molecular biology, secondary education, and general semantics. The title of the book, The Education of T. C. MITS, was meant to emphasize that mathematics can be understood by anyone.

=== Tom, Dick, and Harry ===
The phrase "Tom, Dick and Harry" is a placeholder for unspecified people. The phrase most commonly occurs as "every Tom, Dick and Harry", meaning everyone, and "any Tom, Dick or Harry", meaning anyone. Similar expressions exist in other languages of the world, using commonly used first or last names. The phrase is used in numerous works of fiction.

The precise origin of the phrase is unknown. The earliest known citation is from the 17th-century English theologian John Owen who used the phrase in 1657. Owen told a governing body at Oxford University that "our critical situation and our common interests were discussed out of journals and newspapers by every Tom, Dick and Harry." Pairs of common male names, particularly Jack and Tom, Dick and Tom, or Tom and Tib, were often used generically in Elizabethan times. For example, a variation of the phrase can be found in Shakespeare's Henry IV, Part 1 (1597): "I am sworn brother to a leash of Drawers, and can call them by their names, as Tom, Dicke, and Francis."

The phrase is a rhetorical device known as a tricolon. The most common form of tricolon in English is an ascending tricolon, and as such the names are always said in order of ascending syllable length. Other examples of this gradation include "tall, dark and handsome", "hook, line and sinker", "The Good, the Bad and the Ugly", "lock, stock and barrel"; and so on.

=== Tommy Atkins ===
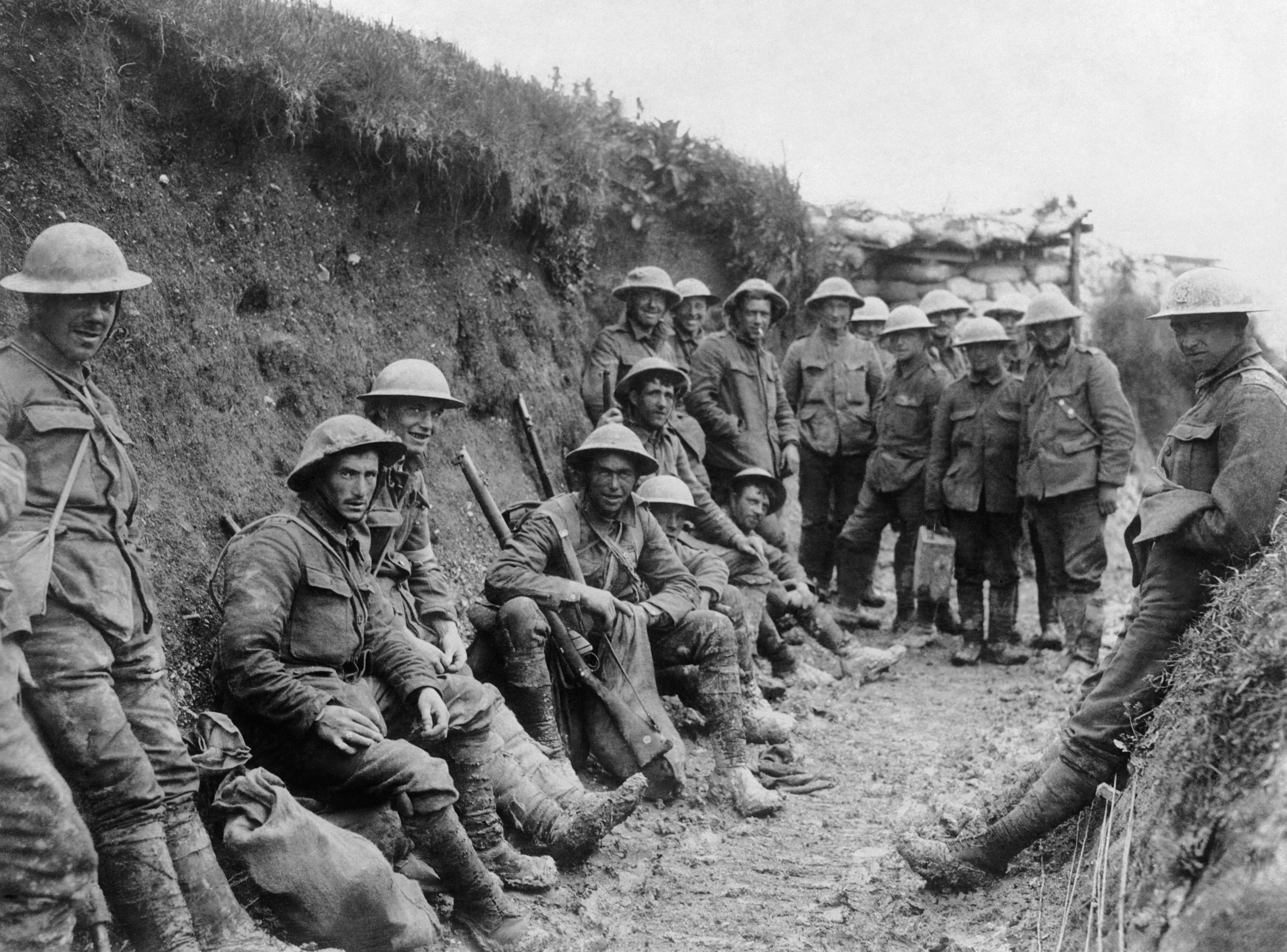
"Tommies" from the Royal Irish Rifles in the Battle of the Somme's trenches during the First World War

Tommy Atkins (often just Tommy) is slang for a common soldier in the British Army. It was well established during the nineteenth century, but is particularly associated with the First World War. It can be used as a term of reference, or as a form of address. German soldiers would call out to "Tommy" across no man's land if they wished to speak to a British soldier. French and Commonwealth troops would also call British soldiers "Tommies". In more recent times, the term Tommy Atkins has been used less frequently, although the name "Tom" is occasionally still heard; private soldiers in the British Army's Parachute Regiment are still referred to as "Toms".

Tommy Atkins or Thomas Atkins has been used as a generic name for a common British soldier for many years. The origin of the term is a subject of debate, but it is known to have been used as early as 1743. A letter sent from Jamaica about a mutiny amongst the troops says "except for those from N. America ye Marines and Tommy Atkins behaved splendidly".

A common belief is that the name was chosen by Arthur Wellesley, 1st Duke of Wellington, having been inspired by the bravery of a soldier at the Battle of Boxtel in 1794 during the Flanders Campaign. After a fierce engagement, the Duke, in command of the 33rd Regiment of Foot, purportedly spotted the best man-at-arms in the regiment, Private Thomas Atkins, terribly wounded. The private said, "It's all right, sir. It's all in a day's work," and died shortly after. According to the Imperial War Museum, this theory has Wellesley choosing the name in 1843.

According to J. H. Leslie, writing in Notes and Queries in 1912, "Tommy Atkins" was chosen as a generic name by the War Office in 1815, in every sample infantry form in the Soldiers Account Book, signing with a mark. The Cavalry form had Trumpeter William Jones and Sergeant John Thomas, though they did not use a mark. Leslie observes the same name in the 1837 King's Regulations, pages 204 and 210, and later editions. Leslie comments that this disproves the anecdote about the Duke of Wellington selecting the name in 1843.

The Oxford English Dictionary states its origin as "arising out of the casual use of this name in the specimen forms given in the official regulations from 1815 onward"; the citation references Collection of Orders, Regulations, etc., pp. 75–87, published by the War Office, 31 August 1815. The name is used for an exemplary cavalry and infantry soldier; other names used included William Jones and John Thomas. Thomas Atkins continued to be used in the Soldier's Account Book until the early 20th century.

=== Uncle Tom Cobley ===
The phrase "Uncle Tom Cobley and all" is used in British English as a humorous or whimsical way of saying et al., often to express exasperation at the large number of people in a list. The phrase comes from a Devon folk song, "Widecombe Fair", collected around 1890 by Sabine Baring-Gould. Its chorus ends with a long list of people: "Bill Brewer, Jan Stewer, Peter Gurney, Peter Davy, Dan'l Whiddon, Harry Hawke, Old Uncle Tom Cobley and all." The surname is spelt as "Cobleigh" in some references.

The name "Cobleigh" is of Anglo-Saxon origin. It has many spelling variants, "including Cobley, Coblegh, Cobleigh, Cobligh, Coboleche and others". The name "Cobleigh" seems to be particularly associated with South Devon. It is a predominant form e.g. in the Devon and Exeter Gazette. On 8 November 1909, an obituary claimed that the recently deceased farmer "learned farming, at Colebrook, with the original 'Uncle Tom Cobleigh' ..... who died between 50 and 60 years since. Uncle Tom Cobleigh was partial to sport, and hunted a pack of harriers." This also names the village of Coiebrooke, but uses the alternative spelling, and gives a vague date of "between" 1849 and 1859.

Whether Tom Cobley, or the other characters from the song, ever existed is uncertain. Local historians have attempted to trace them in and around Dartmoor (for if they did ride to the fair at Widecombe, they may have travelled some distance). There is some suggestion that his relatives have been traced to a family which had moved to Plymouth in the early 1900s, but that no longer hold the name Cobley. The strongest claim is held by the village of Spreyton, to the north of the moor, whose churchyard does indeed contain the grave of a Tom Cobley, buried 11 January 1844. However this is said to be the grave of the nephew of the "real" Tom Cobley, who died in 1794 and whose grave is unmarked. Cobley disapproved of his nephew and kept him out of his will (signed at Pascoe house, Colebrooke). The house at Butsford Barton, Colebrooke, was supposed to have been the home of Uncle Tom Cobley.

The original "Uncle Tom Cobley lived in a house near Yeoford Junction, in the Parish of Spreyton. His will was signed on January 20, 1787, and was proved on March 14, 1794. He was a genial old bachelor. Mr Samuel Peach, his oldest relation living, tells me,"My great-uncle, who succeeded him, with whom I lived for some years, died in 1843, over eighty years of age; he married, but left no children."

== Other names ==
In Australia and New Zealand, John (or Jane) Citizen is usually seen as a placeholder in credit card advertisements, while Joe (or Jane) Bloggs is also commonly used in speech. Joe Blow is also used, often to suggest a possibly undesirable person. For example: "You left the door open so any Joe Blow could have walked in." Also used: Fred Nurk, Joe Farnarkle.

In Ireland Joe Soap is used as a generic reference to a male. Also Seán and Síle Citizen; Irish: Seán Ó Rudaí, from rud = thing(s).

In Canada, during the 1960s, a person appeared in editorial cartoons called Uno Who, representing an average, downtrodden citizen. He was always shown wearing a bankruptcy barrel (as did Will Johnstone's earlier and similar character, "the Taxpayer", for the American New York World Telegram). Québecers also use Monsieur-Madame-Tout-le-Monde ("Mr-and-Ms-Everybody") or Monsieur Untel ("Mr-So-and-so"). Jos Bleau (Joe Blow, spelled according to the rules of French) and G. Raymond are also used in Canada. Occasionally, names which are invariant when translated between English and French are favoured in advertising material (such as "Nicole Martin" or "Carole Martin" on packets of retail coupons).

- Joe the Plumber
- Joe Sixpack
- Private Snuffy or Joe Snuffy (used in the US Army)

== See also ==
- Placeholder word
- List of placeholder names
- Placeholder names in cryptography
- Metasyntactic variable
- Everyman
- Commoner
- Lorem ipsum
- Fictional company
- Fictional brand
- Evil corporation
- Independent Studio Services § Fictional brands
- Dummy pronoun
- Nonce word
- Expletive attributive
