= Citizen (disambiguation) =

A citizen is a person with citizenship, i. e. a membership in a sovereign political community such as a country.

Citizen or citizens may also refer to:

== Arts and literature ==
- "Citizen", a song by Northlane from their 2017 album Mesmer
- Citizen: An American Lyric, a 2014 book by American poet Claudia Rankine
- Citizen (album), an album by Army of Me
- Citizen (2001 film), a 2001 Tamil film directed by Saravana Subbiah
- Citizen (2008 film), a Kannada film directed by Om Sai Prakash
- Citizens (book), a 1989 book on the French revolution by Simon Schama
- Citizens!, a British indie rock band
- Citizens (band), a Christian Contemporary-Indie-Alternative-Rock band from Seattle, Washington
- Citizen (band), an American emo revival band from Southeast Michigan and Northwest Ohio
- Citizens (radio series), a British drama series on BBC Radio 4 from 1987 to 1991
- Citizen (Clinton book), a 2024 memoir by Bill Clinton
- Citizenship (What We Do in the Shadows), an episode of the TV series What We Do in the Shadows

== Business ==
- Citizen Watch or Citizen Holdings, a Japanese maker of watches and other consumer electronic devices often branded as "Citizen"
- Citizens Financial Group, an American bank headquartered in Providence, Rhode Island
- Citizens Insurance, the name for state government established, non-profit insurers in the American states of Florida and Louisiana
- Citizens Republic Bancorp, an American bank headquartered in Flint, Michigan

=== Newspapers ===
- Citizen (Chicago newspaper), a Chicago newspaper group also producing the Ravenswood Citizen, North Side Citizen, and Uptown Citizen at various times from 1910 to 1930
- The Ottawa Citizen, a newspaper in Canada's capital known locally as "The Citizen"

== Politics ==
- Citizens (Chilean political party) (Ciudadanos), a Chilean political party
- Citizens (Friuli Venezia Giulia political party), a civic movement active in Friuli Venezia Giulia, Italy
- CITIZENS (Slovak political party) (OBČANIA), name of the Alliance of the New Citizen between 2013 and 2014
- Citizens (Spanish political party) (Ciudadanos), a Spanish political party

== Other ==
- Citizen's dividend, a proposal that all citizens receive regular payments (dividends) from revenue raised by leasing or taxing the monopoly of valuable land and other natural resources
- Citizen AA, a sports club in Hong Kong First Division League
- London Citizens, also known as "Citizens", an alliance of community organisations in London
- Old Citizens, alumni of the City of London School
- "The Citizens" is a commonly used nickname for Manchester City F.C.
- "The Citizens" is the former nickname of Norwich City F.C.
- Citizen (app), safety-related mobile application

== See also ==
- The Citizen (disambiguation)
