= Commonwealth (disambiguation) =

Commonwealth is an English term meaning a political community.

Commonwealth or Common Wealth may also refer to:

== Political entities ==
See also Places, below

- Commonwealth (U.S. insular area), a term used for two current and one former self-governing U.S. territories
- Commonwealth (U.S. state), a term used by four U.S. states in their full official state names, specifically:
  - Commonwealth of Massachusetts, the full name of Massachusetts
  - Commonwealth of Kentucky, the full name of Kentucky
  - Commonwealth of Pennsylvania, the full name of Pennsylvania
  - Commonwealth of Virginia, the full name of Virginia
- Commonwealth of Nations, an intergovernmental organisation of 56 member states comprising mostly former British colonies; formerly called British Commonwealth of Nations
- Commonwealth Government, used to refer to the Australian Government
- Commonwealth of Independent States, an intergovernmental organisation of Post-Soviet republics
- Lusophone Commonwealth, officially the Community of Portuguese Language Countries, an intergovernmental organisation consisting of former Portuguese colonies
- Commonwealth of England, the republican government ruling England, and later Ireland and Scotland, 1649–1660
- Commonwealth realm, a sovereign state which has Charles III as its monarch and head of state
- Polish–Lithuanian Commonwealth, a constitutional monarchy that ruled Poland, Lithuania and much of the rest of Eastern Europe between 1569 and 1795
- Common Wealth Party, a former political party in the United Kingdom

== Arts, entertainment, and media ==
=== Literature ===
- Common Wealth: Economics for a Crowded Planet, a 2004 book by Jeffrey Sachs
- Commonwealth (Hardt and Negri book), by Michael Hardt and Antonio Negri
- Commonwealth (Goebel novel), a 2008 novel by Joey Goebel
- Commonwealth (Patchett novel), a 2016 novel by Ann Patchett
- Commonwealth Saga, a series of science fiction novels by Peter F. Hamilton

=== Music ===
- "Commonwealth" (song), bootleg song by the Beatles
- Commonwealth (New Grass Revival album), 1981
- Commonwealth (Sloan album)
- "Commonwealth", a song by the American band Bright from the album The Miller Fantasies

=== Periodicals ===
- The Commonwealth (Pittsburgh), a 19th-century newspaper in Pittsburgh, Pennsylvania
- Commonwealth Magazine a web-based publication that covers politics, policy, ideas, and civic life
- The Commonwealth, a late-19th century publication of the London branch of the Christian Social Union
- The Commonwealth, the official publication of the Commonwealth Club of California

=== Other uses ===
- Commonwealth (statue), a 1905 statue on the Pennsylvania State Capitol grounds
- The Commonwealth, the setting of Fallout 4

== Companies and charities ==
- Commonwealth (automobile company), a luxury auto company that produced cars from 1917 to 1922
- Commonwealth (restaurant), a defunct Michelin-starred restaurant in San Francisco, California
- Commonwealth Aircraft Corporation, a former Australian aircraft manufacturer
- Commonwealth Athletic Conference, a high school athletic conference in Massachusetts
- Commonwealth Bank, an Australian multinational bank
- Commonwealth Brands, a tobacco company now called Commonwealth-Altadis, part of Imperial Tobacco
- Commonwealth Engineering, a former Australian engineering company
- Commonwealth Fund, an American charity promoting health care reform in the United States

== Places ==
=== United States ===
- Commonwealth, Virginia, an unincorporated community
- Commonwealth, Wisconsin, a town
  - Commonwealth (community), Wisconsin, an unincorporated community within the town
- Commonwealth Avenue (disambiguation)
- Commonwealth Club Historic District, a private club in Richmond, Virginia

=== Elsewhere ===
- Commonwealth, Singapore, a subzone in Singapore
  - Commonwealth MRT station, a metro station along the East West Line in Singapore
- Commonwealth Mountain, a mountain on Ellesmere Island, Nunavut, Canada
- Commonwealth of Australia, the full name of Australia
- Commonwealth of the Bahamas, the full name of The Bahamas

== Military ==
- HMAS Commonwealth, a Royal Australian Navy shore base located in Kure, Japan from 1948 to 1956
- HMS Commonwealth (1903), a Royal Navy battleship from 1905 to 1921

== Schools ==
- Commonwealth College (disambiguation), three American colleges
- Commonwealth School, an independent high school in Boston, Massachusetts
- Commonwealth Secondary School, a secondary school in Jurong East, Singapore

== Sports ==
- Commonwealth Games, a multi-sport event first held in 1930 involving Commonwealth countries
- Commonwealth Youth Games, youth version of the Commonwealth Games first held in 2000

== See also ==
- Commonweal (disambiguation)
- Commonwealth Avenue (disambiguation)
- Commonwealth Bank building (disambiguation)
- Commonwealth Brigade (disambiguation)
- Commonwealth Building (disambiguation)
- Commonwealth Club (disambiguation)
- Co-operative Commonwealth (disambiguation)
- Commonwealth Conference (disambiguation)
- Commonwealth District (disambiguation)
