= Commonwealth Avenue Historic District =

Commonwealth Avenue Historic District may refer to:

- Commonwealth Avenue Historic District (Newton, Massachusetts), on the National Register of Historic Places (NRHP)
- Commonwealth Avenue Historic District (North Attleborough, Massachusetts), on the NRHP

== See also ==
- Commonwealth (disambiguation)
- Commonwealth Avenue (disambiguation)
- Commonwealth Club Historic District, Richmond, Virginia
