= Monetary hegemony =

In which a single state controls the international monetary system

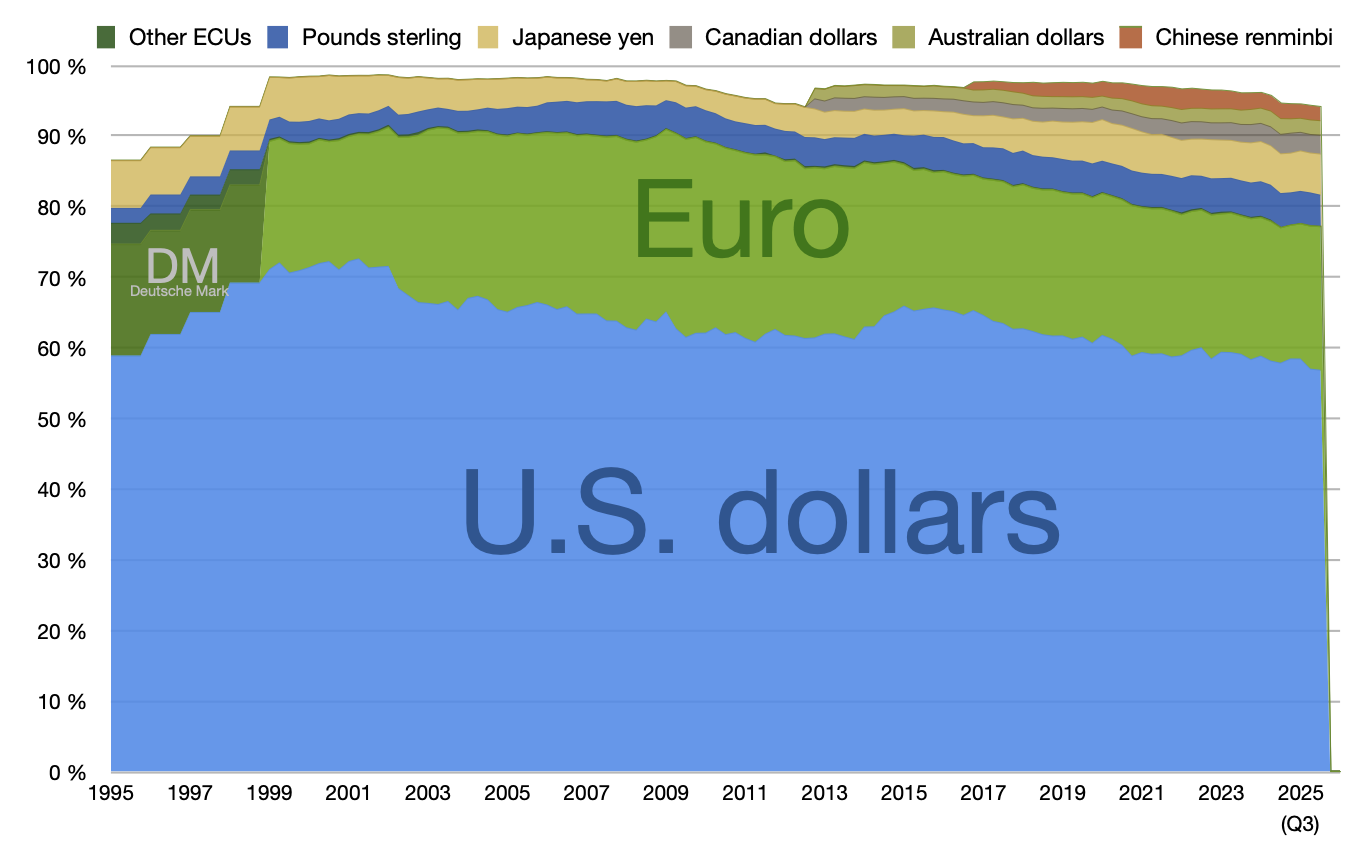
Distribution of global reserve currencies

Monetary hegemony is an economic and political concept in which a single state has decisive influence over the functions of the international monetary system. A monetary hegemon would need:

- accessibility to international credits,
- foreign exchange markets
- the management of balance of payments problems in which the hegemon operates under no balance of payments constraint.
- the direct (and absolute) power to enforce a unit of account in which economic calculations are made in the world economy.

The term monetary hegemony appeared in Michael Hudson's Super Imperialism, describing not only an asymmetrical relationship that the US dollar has to the global economy, but the structures of this hegemonic edifice that Hudson felt supported it, namely the International Monetary Fund and the World Bank. The US dollar continues to underpin the world economy and is the key currency for medium of international exchange, unit of account (e.g. pricing of oil), and unit of storage (e.g. treasury bills and bonds) and, despite arguments to the contrary, is not in a state of hegemonic decline (cf. Fields & Vernengo, 2011, 2012).

The international monetary system has borne witness to two monetary hegemons: Britain and the United States.

== British monetary hegemony ==
Great Britain rose to the status of monetary hegemon in 1871 with widespread adoption of the gold standard. During the gold standard of the late nineteenth century, Britain became the greatest exporter of financial capital. Its capital city, London, also became center of the world gold, money, and financial markets. This was a major reason for states adopting the gold standard. For Paris, Berlin, and other financial centers to attract the lucrative financial business from London, it was necessary to emulate Britain's gold standard, for it reduced transaction costs, represented creditworthiness, and sound financial policy from government (Schwartz, 1996). The city of London was the leading supplier of both short term and long term credit, which was channeled abroad. Its extensive financial facilities provided cheap credit, which enhanced the strength of the pound through deepening its use for international payments. According to Walter (1991), during the decades of 1870–1913, "sterling bills and short-term credits financed perhaps 60 percent of world trade" (p. 88).

Britain's foreign investment cultivated foreign economies for the use of sterling. In 1850, Britain's net overseas assets grew from 7 percent of the stock of net national wealth to 14 percent in 1870, and to around 32 percent in 1913 (Edelstein, 1994). The world had never before seen one nation committing so much of its national income and savings to foreign investment. Britain's foreign lending practices possessed two technical aspects that gave greater credence to the prominence of sterling as a unit of storage and medium of exchange: first, British loans to foreigners were made in sterling, which allowed the borrowing country to service the debt more conveniently with its sterling reserves, and second, Britain’s use of written instructions to pay or bill exchanges were drawn in London to finance international trade.

More importantly, its unrivalled ability to run current account deficits through the issuance of its unquestioned currency and its discount rate endowed Britain with a special privilege. The effects of the discount rate had a "controlling influence on Britain’s balance of payments regardless of what other central banks were doing" (Cleveland, 1976, p. 17). When other central banks engaged in a tug of war over international capital flows, "the Bank of England could tug the hardest" (Eichengreen, 1985, p. 6). In this regard, British monetary hegemony was seldom threatened by crises of convertibility for its gold reserves were insulated by the discount rate and all foreign rates followed the British rate. The prominence of London's credit drains led Keynes (1930) to write that the sway of London "on credit conditions throughout the world was so predominant that the Bank of England could almost have claimed to be the conductor of the international orchestra" (p. 306–307). Karl Polanyi in his renowned work the Great Transformation states "Pax Britannica held its sway sometimes by the ominous poise of heavy ship’s cannon, but more frequently it prevailed by the timely pull of a thread in the international monetary network" (Polanyi, 1944, p. 24).

Britain's position waned due to inter-state competition, insufficient domestic investment, and World War I. Despite its economic weaknesses, British political sway continued after World War I, which led to the gold-exchange standard created under the Genoa Conference of 1922. This system failed, however, not only due to Britain's incapability, but to the growing decentralization of the international monetary system with the rise of New York and Paris as financial centers that resulted in the collapse of the gold exchange standard in 1931. The Gold Exchange standard of the interwar period, as Kindleberger cogently stated, collapsed because "Britain couldn't and America wouldn't." In fact, Kindleberger provides a slightly different variation of monetary hegemony that possesses five functions rather than three defined here.

== American monetary hegemony ==
The end of World War II witnessed the recentralization of monetary power in the hands of a United States that had been left largely unscathed by the war. The United States had emerged from World War II with the ideals of economic interdependence, accountability, and altruism, expressed in the vision of universal multilateralism. Above all, multilateralism simply meant nondiscrimination via the elimination or reduction of barriers and obstacles to trade, but more importantly was the maintenance of barriers "that were difficult to apply in a nondiscriminatory manner" (Ruggie, 1982, p. 213). In essence, the term multilateralism differs today, compared to what it meant after World War II. US interests in a multilateral, liberal world economy would not be grounded entirely in idealistic internationalism. There was the cold, calculating necessity of generating a US export surplus. This would obviate government spending, stimulate the domestic economy, substitute for domestic investment, and avert reorganization for certain industries in the economy that were overbuilt during the war effort. For these reasons the "idea of an export surplus took on a special importance" (Block, 1977, p. 35) for the US. The production of an export surplus was therefore intimately connected with establishing a world economy that was free of imperial systems, as well as bilateral payments and trading systems. The US would therefore aim to open its predecessor's empire to American trade and to garner British compliance to create its postwar monetary system through financial leverage, namely the Anglo-American Financial Agreement of 1945.

This new vision of universal multilateralism was, however, forestalled by the new economic realities of a war-torn Europe, symbolized by Britain's financial inability to maintain sterling convertibility. Combined with this new economic reality was the political-military threat of the Soviet Union. On 29 December 1945, only two days before the expiration of Bretton Woods, Soviet Foreign Minister Vyacheslave Molotov notified George Kennan, "that for the amount [offered] the U.S.S.R. would not subscribe to the articles" (James et al., 1994, p. 617). Two months later, in February 1946, Kennan sent his famous telegram to Washington, which inquired into why the Soviet Union had not ratified the Bretton Woods Agreement. The telegram would later be regarded as the beginning of US Cold War policy (James et al., 1994).

The US thus altered its vision from universal multilateralism to regional multilateralism, which it would promote in Europe through the Marshall Plan, the European Recovery Program (ERP), and the European Payments Union (EPU). With the dissolution of the EPU came the prospect of a real multilateral world as the Bretton Woods monetary system came into effect in 1958. The same year marked the beginning of a permanent US balance of payments deficits.

Throughout the 1960s, the Bretton Woods system had permitted the US to finance approximately 70 percent of its cumulative balance of payments deficits via dual processes of gold demonetization and liability financing. The liability financing enabled the US to undertake heavy overseas military expenditures and "foreign commitments, and to retain substantial flexibility in domestic economic policy" (Gowa, 1983, p. 63).

In 1970, the US was at the center of international instability that was a consequence of its rapid monetary growth (James, 1996). The US, however, had learned from the fate of its predecessor's key currency (i.e. Sterling). Britain's experience as monetary hegemon demonstrated to the US the problems faced by a reserve currency when foreign monetary authorities, individuals, and investors chose to convert their reserves. In terms of monetary power defined by reserves, the US share of reserves had fallen from 50 percent in 1950 to 11 percent in August 1971 (Odell, 1982, p. 218). Although, the US had become considerably weak in defending convertibility, its rule-making power was second to none. Rather than being constrained by the system it created, the US moved to the conclusion that it "was better to attack the system than to work within it" (James, 1996, p. 203). This decision was based on the recognition of the inseparability between foreign policy and monetary policy. The termination of the Bretton Woods system signified the subordination of monetary policy to foreign policy. The closing of the gold window was a fix that was assigned to "free…foreign policy from constraints imposed by weaknesses in the financial system" (Gowa, 1983, p. 69).

US Monetary Hegemony persists as does the Bretton Woods System, as Dooley, Folkerts-Landau, Garber (2003) contend in their work An Essay on The Revised Bretton Woods System. The rules of the Bretton Woods system have stayed the same but the players have changed. The Post Bretton Woods system or Bretton Woods II has given rise to a new periphery for which the development strategy is export-led growth supported by undervalued exchange rates, capital controls and official capital outflows in the form of accumulation of reserve asset claims on the center country (i.e. US). In other words, Asia has replaced Europe in financing US balance of payments deficits.

== See also ==
- Federal Reserve System
- Numismatics
- Petrodollar recycling
- Petrodollar warfare
- Petroeuro
- Seignorage
- World currency
