= Petrocurrency =

Financial asset backed by a country's revenues from petroleum exports

Petrocurrency (or petrodollar) is a word used with three distinct meanings, often confused:

1. Dollars paid to oil-producing nations (petrodollar recycling)—a term invented in the 1970s meaning trading surpluses of oil-producing nations.
2. Currencies of oil-producing nations which tend to rise in value against other currencies when the price of oil rises (and fall when it falls).
3. Pricing of oil in US dollars: currencies used as a unit of account to price oil in the international market.

== Oil-producers' trading surpluses ==
"Petrocurrency" or (more commonly) "petrodollars" are popular shorthand for revenues from petroleum exports, mainly from the OPEC members plus Russia and Norway. Especially during periods of historically expensive oil, the associated financial flows can reach a scale of hundreds of billions of US dollar-equivalents per year – including a wide range of transactions in a variety of currencies, some pegged to the US dollar and some not.

== Currencies correlated with oil prices ==
The pound sterling has sometimes been regarded as a petrocurrency as a result of North Sea oil exports.

The Dutch guilder was once regarded as a petrocurrency due to its large quantities of natural gas and North Sea oil exports. The guilder strengthened greatly in the 1970s, after OPEC began a series of price hikes throughout the decade that consequently increased the value of all oil-producing nations' currencies. However, as a result of the appreciation of the Guilder, industrial manufacturing and services in the Netherlands during the 1970s and into the 1980s were crowded out of the larger national economy, and the country became increasingly non-competitive on world markets due to the high cost of Dutch industrial and service exports. This phenomenon is often referred to in economics literature as Dutch disease.

The Canadian dollar is sometimes viewed as a petrocurrency, but this status is controversial. In theory, as the price of oil rises, oil-related export revenues rise for an oil exporting nation, and thus constitute a larger monetary component of exports. As their oil sands deposits have been increasingly exploited and sold on the international market, movements of the Canadian dollar have sometimes been correlated with the price of oil. In 2015, University of British Columbia Professor Werner Antweiler predicted that if the share of oil and gas exports increases further, the link between oil prices and the exchange rate may become even stronger. However, in recent years, the opposite trend has become apparent, with the Bank of Canada and major Canadian financial institutions reporting that there is a disconnect between oil demand and the Canadian dollar's movement (having been virtually static within foreign exchange markets throughout the 2021–2022 global energy crisis). There is no conclusive explanation for this disparity, but speculated reasons include weak investor interest in Canadian oilsands (due to the growing rise of ESG investment), the increasing size of the US petroleum industry and the relative reputation of the US Dollar.

== Currencies used to trade oil ==
As the world's dominant reserve currency, the United States dollar has been a major currency for trading oil. In August 2018, Venezuela joined the group of countries that allow their oil to be purchased in currencies other than US dollars, thus allowing purchases in euros, Yuan (Petroyuan) and other directly convertible currencies. Other nations that permit this include Iran.

=== World War II to 1970 ===
After WWII, international oil prices were for some time based on discounts or premiums relative to that for oil in the Gulf of Mexico.

After the Bretton Woods conference in the year 1944, the UK and its allies discontinued linking their currencies with gold; however, the US dollar continued to be pegged to gold, at $35 per ounce—from 1941 to 1971.

=== 1970 to 2000 ===
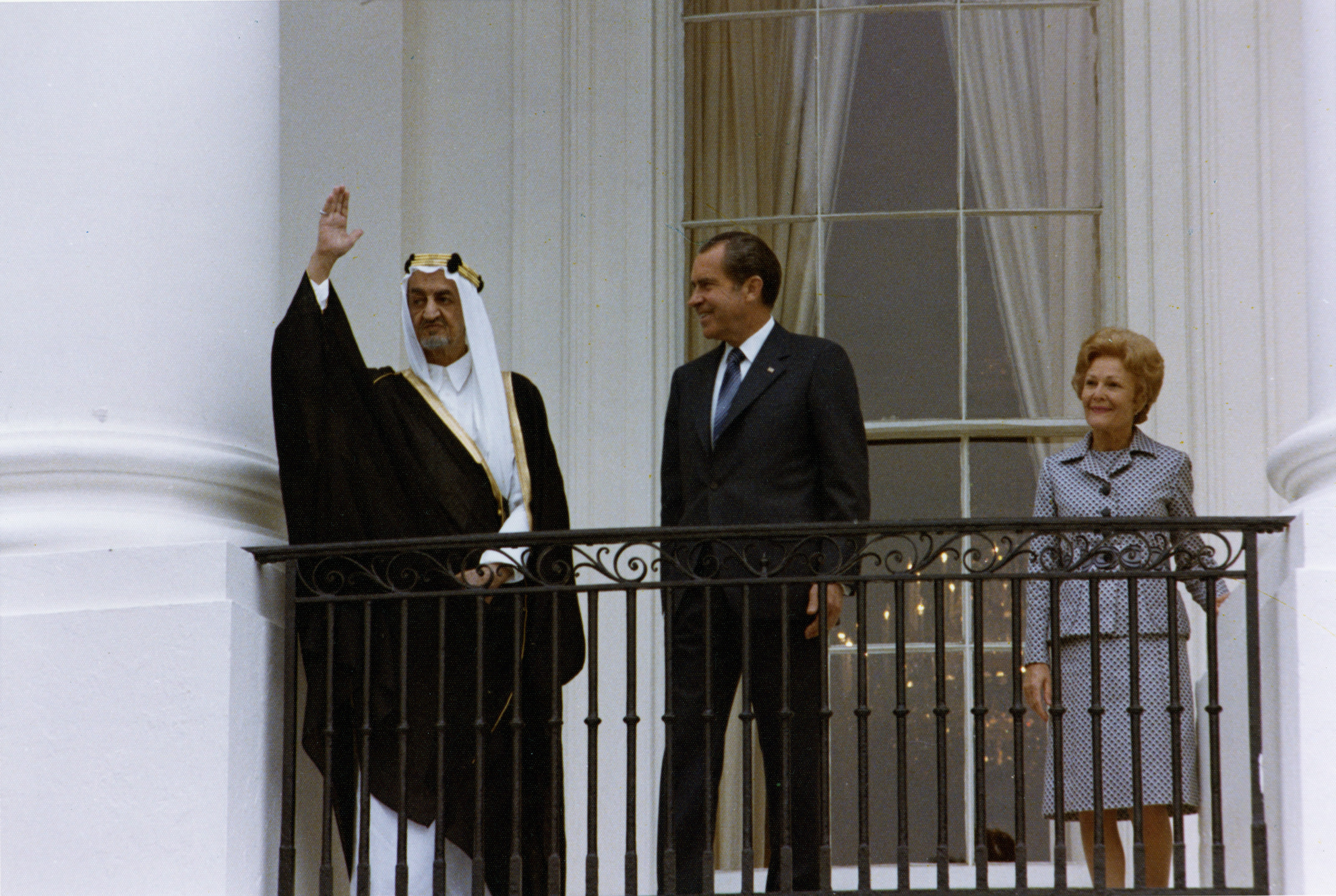
King Faisal of Saudi Arabia with U.S. president Richard Nixon and his wife Pat Nixon in Washington, D.C., 27 May 1971

In 1971, President Nixon cancelled the fixed-rate convertibility of US dollars to gold.

President Richard Nixon and his Secretary of State, Henry Kissinger, in a series of meetings with the Saudi royal family, agreed that America would provide military protection for Saudi Arabia's oil fields while, in return, the Saudis would price their oil exclusively in United States dollars; the Saudis were to refuse all other currencies, except the U.S. dollar, as payment for their oil exports.

Since the signing of these agreements in 1971 and 1973, OPEC oil is generally quoted in US dollars.

In October 1973, six OPEC member countries (Saudi Arabia, Kuwait, Abu Dhabi, Qatar, Libya, and Algeria) declared an oil embargo on the United States and the Netherlands. This was in response to the United States' and Western Europe's support of Israel in the Yom Kippur War. The embargo was lifted in March 1974.

=== Iran ===
Since the beginning of 2003, Iran has required payment in euros for exports to Asia and Europe. The government opened an Iranian Oil Bourse on the free trade zone on the island of Kish, for the express purpose of trading oil priced in other currencies, including euros.

=== OPEC and shale oil boom ===
The unconventional tight oil (shale oil) boom in the USA starting in the early 2000s through 2010s (as well as increased production capacity in many other countries) greatly limited OPEC's ability to control oil prices. Consequently, due to a drastic fall in Nymex crude oil price to as low as $35.35 per barrel in 2015, many oil-exporting countries have had severe problems in balancing their budget.

Thirty years from now there will be a huge amount of oil – and no buyers. Oil will be left in the ground. The Stone Age came to an end, not because we had a lack of stones, and the oil age will come to an end not because we have a lack of oil.

— Sheikh Ahmed Zaki Yamani, former oil minister of Saudi Arabia and an active minister in OPEC for 25 years, in 2000

By 2016, many oil-exporting countries had been adversely affected by low oil prices including Russia, Saudi Arabia, Azerbaijan, Venezuela and Nigeria.

=== Venezuela ===
The petro, or petromoneda, launched in February 2018, was a cryptocurrency developed by the government of Venezuela. Announced in December 2017, it was claimed to be backed by the country's oil and mineral reserves, and it was intended to supplement Venezuela's plummeting bolívar fuerte currency, purportedly as a means of circumventing U.S. sanctions and accessing international financing.

On January 15, 2024, the token was shut down and any remaining holdings were liquidated.

=== China ===
In March 2018, China opened a futures market denominated in Yuan which could encourage the use of its currency as a petrocurrency.

== See also ==
- Bretton Woods system collapse
- Contango
- Green economy
- Petro (token)
- Petrobourse
- Petroleum politics
- Petro-Islam
- Monetary hegemony
- Reserve currency
