= World economy =

World GDP per capita between 1500 and 2003

The world economy or global economy is the economy of all humans in the world, referring to the global economic system, which includes all economic activities conducted both within and between nations, including production, consumption, economic management, work in general, financial transactions and trade of goods and services. In some contexts, the two terms are distinct: the "international" or "global economy" is measured separately and distinguished from national economies, while the "world economy" is simply an aggregate of the separate countries' measurements. Beyond the minimum standard concerning value in production, use and exchange, the definitions, representations, models and valuations of the world economy vary widely. It is inseparable from the geography and ecology of planet Earth.

It is common to limit questions of the world economy exclusively to human economic activity, and the world economy is typically judged in monetary terms, even in cases in which there is no efficient market to help valuate certain goods or services, or in cases in which a lack of independent research, genuine data or government cooperation makes calculating figures difficult. Typical examples are illegal drugs and other black market goods, which by any standard are a part of the world economy, but for which there is, by definition, no legal market of any kind.

Even in cases in which there is a clear and efficient market to establish monetary value, economists do not typically use the current or official exchange rate to translate the monetary units of this market into a single unit for the world economy since exchange rates typically do not closely reflect worldwide value — for example, in cases where the volume or price of transactions is closely regulated by the government. Rather, market valuations in a local currency are typically translated to a single monetary unit using the idea of purchasing power. This is the method used below, which is used for estimating worldwide economic activity in terms of real United States dollars or euros; however, the world economy can be evaluated and expressed in many more ways. For example, it is unclear how many of the world's 7.8 billion people, as of March 2020, have most of their economic activity reflected in these valuations.

Until the middle of the 19th century, global output was dominated by China and India. Waves of the Industrial Revolution in Western Europe and Northern America shifted the shares to the Western Hemisphere. As of 2026, the following 12 countries and 2 collectives account for at least 2.0% of global economy by either Gross Domestic Product (GDP) in nominal or Purchasing Power Parity (PPP) terms: Brazil, Canada, China, France, Germany, India, Indonesia, Italy, Japan, Russia, the United Kingdom, the United States, the African Union and the European Union.

Between 1820 and 2000, global income inequality increased with almost 50%; however, this change occurred mostly before 1950. Afterwards, the level of inequality remained mostly stable. It is important to differentiate between between-country inequality, which was the driving force for this pattern, and within country inequality, which remained largely constant. Global income inequality peaked approximately in the 1970s, when world income was distributed bimodally into "rich" and "poor" countries with little overlap. Since then, inequality has been rapidly decreasing, and this trend seems to be accelerating. Income distribution is now unimodal, with most people living in middle-income countries.

In the 2000s, a study by the World Institute for Development Economics Research at United Nations University found that the richest 1% of adults owned 40% of global assets, and that the richest 10% of adults accounted for 85% of the world total. The bottom half of the world adult population owned barely 1% of global wealth. Oxfam International reported that the richest 1 percent of people owned 48 percent of global wealth as of 2013, and would own more than half of global wealth by 2016. In 2014, Oxfam reported that the 85 wealthiest individuals in the world had a combined wealth equal to that of the bottom half of the world's population, or about 3.5 billion people. Despite high levels of government investment, the global economy decreased by 3.4% in 2020 in the midst of the COVID-19 pandemic, an improvement from the World Bank's initial prediction of a 5.2 percent decrease. Cities account for 80% of global GDP, thus they faced the brunt of this decline. The world economy increased again in 2021 with an estimated 5.5 percent rebound.

== Overview ==
=== World economy by country groups ===
Country group	List of country groups by GDP (nominal) in 2026 (or at peaked level)		List of country groups by GDP (PPP) in 2026 (or at peaked level)		Number of countries	Major economies
Country group	Value (in millions of US$)	Share of Global GDP	Value (in millions of US$)	Share of Global GDP	Number of countries	Major economies
**Emerging and developing Asia** (Continents: Asia and Oceania)	30,209,314	23.6%	79,761,677	35.6%	30	**China**; **India**; **Indonesia**; Vietnam; Thailand; Bangladesh; Malaysia; Philippines
**Major advanced economies (G7)** (Continents: Europe, North America and Asia)	55,470,253	43.3%	62,871,633	28.0%	7	**United States**; **Japan**; **Germany**; **United Kingdom**; **France**; **Italy**; **Canada**
**Other advanced economies** (advanced economies excluding the G7) (Continents: Europe, Asia, Oceania and North America)	18,764,436	14.7%	24,870,739	11.1%	36	**South Korea**; Spain; Taiwan; **Australia**; Netherlands; Switzerland; Singapore; Belgium; Ireland; Sweden
**Emerging and developing Europe** (Continents: Europe and Asia)	7,134,720	5.6%	16,770,735	7.5%	14	**Russia**; **Turkey**; Poland; Romania; Ukraine
**Middle East and Central Asia** (Continents: Asia and Africa)	5,685,529	4.5%	16,026,391	7.1%	32	**Saudi Arabia**; Egypt; Iran; Pakistan; Kazakhstan; United Arab Emirates; Algeria
**Latin America and the Caribbean** (Continents: South America and North America)	8,225,264	6.4%	15,840,659	7.1%	33	**Brazil**; **Mexico**; **Argentina**; Colombia; Chile
**Sub-Saharan Africa** (Continent: Africa)	2,514,260	2.0%	8,120,047	3.6%	45	Nigeria; **South Africa**
**World**	**128,003,776**	100.0%	**224,261,881**	100.0%	197	

=== World economy by continent ===
**GDP sector composition (2019 estimate)**

Continent	Agricultural	Industrial	Service
**World**	**7,908.260**	**38,354.363**	**81,575.461**
Asia	5,105.362	20,858.549	32,939.397
North America	292.467	5,008.594	18,426.200
Europe	838.199	8,175.402	20,598.902
South America	539.510	2,014.140	5,024.223
Africa	1,076.690	1,941.037	3,559.579
Oceania	56.032	356.641	1,027.160

=== Current world economic league table of largest economies in the world by GDP and share of global economic growth ===
The 30 largest economies by GDP (nominal), GDP (PPP), the highest peak GDP per capita (nominal) and the highest peak GDP per capita (PPP) as of 2026. Members of the G-20 major economies are in bold.
**List of the 30 largest economies** **by GDP (nominal) at their peak level as of 2026 in million US$**	**List of the 30 largest economies** **by GDP (PPP) at their peak level as of 2026 in million Int$**	**List of the 30 economies by highest** **GDP (nominal) per capita at their peak level as of 2026 in million US$**	**List of the 30 economies by highest** **GDP (PPP) per capita at their peak level as of 2026 in Int$**
Rank / Country / Value; — / **World** / 128,003,776; 1 / **United States** / 32,642,373; — / **European Union** / 22,806,152; 2 / **China** / 21,546,403; 3 / **Japan** (2012) / 6,333,804; 4 / **Germany** / 5,471,299; 5 / **United Kingdom** / 4,268,446; 6 / **India** / 4,060,207; — / **African Union** / 3,654,354; 7 / **France** / 3,554,155; 8 / **Russia** / 2,861,156; 9 / **Italy** / 2,701,737; 10 / **Brazil** / 2,654,761; 11 / **Canada** / 2,490,256; 12 / **South Korea** / 2,245,847; 13 / **Mexico** / 2,176,236; 14 / **Australia** / 2,110,657; 15 / Spain / 2,085,276; 16 / **Turkey** / 1,817,987; 17 / **Indonesia** / 1,479,954; 18 / Netherlands / 1,423,856; 19 / **Saudi Arabia** / 1,343,346; 20 / Switzerland / 1,135,739; 21 / Poland / 1,133,088; 22 / Taiwan / 1,019,596; 23 / Nigeria (2014) / 811,134; 24 / Belgium / 772,699; 25 / **Argentina** / 768,206; 26 / Israel / 746,982; 27 / Sweden / 745,081; 28 / Iran (2011) / 722,130; 29 / Ireland (2025) / 721,701; 30 / Singapore / 667,889	Rank / Country / Value; — / **World** / 224,261,881; 1 / **China** / 44,554,951; 2 / **United States** / 32,642,373; — / **European Union** / 30,928,605; 3 / **India** / 19,192,617; — / **African Union** / 12,663,816; 4 / **Russia** / 7,542,897; 5 / **Japan** / 7,324,055; 6 / **Germany** / 6,550,995; 7 / **Indonesia** / 5,483,042; 8 / **Brazil** / 5,266,506; 9 / **United Kingdom** / 4,783,102; 10 / **France** / 4,756,403; 11 / **Turkey** / 4,025,804; 12 / **Italy** / 3,898,990; 13 / **South Korea** / 3,625,973; 14 / **Mexico** / 3,594,397; 15 / Spain / 3,001,678; 16 / **Canada** / 2,915,715; 17 / **Saudi Arabia** (2025) / 2,730,087; 18 / Egypt / 2,600,028; 19 / Nigeria / 2,438,180; 20 / Taiwan / 2,406,687; 21 / Poland / 2,181,830; 22 / **Australia** / 2,106,908; 23 / Vietnam / 2,058,905; 24 / Thailand / 1,983,943; 25 / Bangladesh / 1,909,362; 26 / Iran (2025) / 1,856,013; 27 / Pakistan / 1,806,861; 28 / Malaysia / 1,624,495; 29 / Netherlands / 1,599,125; 30 / **Argentina** / 1,577,460	Rank / Country / Value; 1 / Monaco (2024) / 288,002; 2 / Liechtenstein / 230,417; 3 / Luxembourg / 155,733; 4 / Bermuda (2024) / 142,250; 5 / Ireland / 131,593; 6 / Switzerland / 124,478; 7 / Norway (2022) / 113,122; 8 / Singapore / 109,117; 9 / Qatar (2012) / 108,470; 10 / Iceland / 107,464; 11 / Cayman Islands (2024) / 104,293; 12 / **United States** / 95,212; 13 / Isle of Man (2021) / 94,300; 14 / Macau (2014) / 88,355; 15 / Denmark / 82,714; 16 / San Marino (2008) / 79,110; 17 / Netherlands / 78,535; 18 / **Australia** / 75,172; 19 / Channel Islands (2023) / 74,586; 20 / Faroe Islands (2024) / 74,175; 21 / Israel / 72,441; 22 / Sweden / 69,244; 23 / Austria / 67,020; 24 / **Germany** / 65,699; 25 / Belgium / 64,774; 26 / **United Kingdom** / 61,108; 27 / Hong Kong / 60,322; 28 / Finland / 60,156; 29 / **Canada** / 60,105; 30 / Greenland (2023) / 58,499	Rank / Country / Value; 1 / Monaco (2024) / 270,100; 2 / Liechtenstein (2024) / 210,600; 3 / Qatar (2012) / 180,939; 4 / Singapore / 176,927; 5 / Luxembourg / 156,638; 6 / Ireland (2025) / 155,089; 6 / Macau (2013) / 149,859; 8 / Norway (2022) / 129,914; 9 / Bermuda (2024) / 118,728; 10 / Switzerland / 106,944; 11 / United Arab Emirates (2006) / 106,814; 12 / Taiwan / 103,743; 14 / Guyana / 98,912; 13 / Brunei / 98,028; 15 / **United States** / 95,212; 16 / Denmark / 92,876; 17 / Cayman Islands (2024) / 92,201; 18 / Kuwait (2007) / 91,435; 19 / Netherlands / 88,202; 20 / San Marino / 87,524; 21 / Hong Kong / 85,843; 22 / Isle of Man (2014) / 84,600; 23 / Iceland (2024) / 83,561; 24 / Faroe Islands (2024) / 82,089; 25 / Malta / 80,020; 26 / Andorra (2025) / 79,567; 27 / Belgium / 78,906; 28 / Greenland (2023) / 78,906; 29 / Austria / 78,828; 30 / **Germany** / 78,664

=== Twenty largest economies in the world by nominal GDP ===
The following is a list of the twenty largest economies by nominal GDP at peak value as of the specific year, according to the International Monetary Fund.
Rank	1980	1985	1990	1995	2000	2005	2010	2015	2020	2025	2030	2031
1	United States	United States	United States	United States	United States	United States	United States	United States	United States	United States	United States	United States
2	Japan	Soviet Union	Japan	Japan	Japan	Japan	China	China	China	China	China	China
3	Soviet Union	Japan	Soviet Union	Germany	Germany	Germany	Japan	Japan	Japan	Japan	Japan	India
4	West Germany	West Germany	West Germany	France	United Kingdom	United Kingdom	Germany	Germany	Germany	Germany	Germany	Japan
5	France	France	France	United Kingdom	France	China	United Kingdom	United Kingdom	United Kingdom	United Kingdom	India	Germany
6	United Kingdom	United Kingdom	United Kingdom	Italy	Italy	France	France	France	France	India	United Kingdom	United Kingdom
7	Italy	Italy	Italy	Brazil	China	Italy	Italy	Brazil	India	France	France	France
8	China	Canada	Iran	China	Brazil	Canada	Brazil	Italy	Brazil	Brazil	Brazil	Brazil
9	Canada	China	Canada	Iran	Canada	Spain	Russia	Russia	Italy	Russia	Canada	Canada
10	Mexico	Mexico	Spain	Spain	Mexico	South Korea	India	India	Russia	Italy	Italy	South Korea
Rank	1980	1985	1990	1995	2000	2005	2010	2015	2020	2025	2030	2031
11	Argentina	Argentina	China	Canada	Iran	Mexico	Spain	Canada	Canada	Canada	South Korea	Italy
12	Spain	India	Brazil	South Korea	Spain	Brazil	Canada	Spain	South Korea	South Korea	Russia	Russia
13	Netherlands	Spain	Australia	Russia	South Korea	India	Australia	Australia	Spain	Spain	Mexico	Mexico
14	India	Brazil	Netherlands	Mexico	Russia	Russia	South Korea	South Korea	Australia	Australia	Australia	Australia
15	Saudi Arabia	Iran	India	Netherlands	India	Australia	Mexico	Mexico	Mexico	Mexico	Spain	Spain
16	Australia	Australia	Mexico	Australia	Netherlands	Iran	Netherlands	Turkey	Indonesia	Turkey	Turkey	Turkey
17	Brazil	Netherlands	South Korea	India	Australia	Netherlands	Turkey	Netherlands	Turkey	Indonesia	Indonesia	Indonesia
18	Sweden	Saudi Arabia	Switzerland	Switzerland	Switzerland	Turkey	Indonesia	Indonesia	Netherlands	Netherlands	Netherlands	Netherlands
19	Belgium	Nigeria	Sweden	Argentina	Argentina	Switzerland	Iran	Nigeria	Saudi Arabia	Saudi Arabia	Saudi Arabia	Saudi Arabia
20	Switzerland	Sweden	Argentina	Belgium	Taiwan	Sweden	Switzerland	Saudi Arabia	Nigeria	Switzerland	Poland	Poland

=== Twenty largest economies in the world by GDP (PPP) ===
List of twenty largest economies by GDP based on purchasing power parity at peak value as of the specific year according to the International Monetary Fund and the CIA World Factbook.
Rank	1980	1985	1990	1995	2000	2005	2010	2015	2020	2025	2030	2031
1	United States	United States	United States	United States	United States	United States	United States	United States	China	China	China	China
2	Soviet Union	Soviet Union	Soviet Union	Japan	China	China	China	China	United States	United States	United States	United States
3	Japan	Japan	Japan	China	Japan	Japan	India	India	India	India	India	India
4	West Germany	West Germany	West Germany	Germany	Germany	India	Japan	Japan	Japan	Russia	Russia	Russia
5	Italy	Italy	Italy	Russia	India	Germany	Germany	Germany	Germany	Japan	Japan	Japan
6	France	France	France	India	Italy	Russia	Russia	Russia	Russia	Germany	Germany	Indonesia
7	United Kingdom	United Kingdom	China	Italy	France	France	Brazil	Brazil	France	Indonesia	Indonesia	Germany
8	Brazil	Brazil	United Kingdom	France	United Kingdom	Italy	France	United Kingdom	United Kingdom	Brazil	Brazil	Brazil
9	Mexico	Mexico	India	Brazil	Russia	United Kingdom	United Kingdom	France	Brazil	France	United Kingdom	United Kingdom
10	India	India	Brazil	United Kingdom	Brazil	Brazil	Italy	Indonesia	Indonesia	United Kingdom	France	France
Rank	1980	1985	1990	1995	2000	2005	2010	2015	2020	2025	2030	2031
11	Spain	China	Mexico	Mexico	Mexico	Mexico	Indonesia	Italy	Italy	Turkey	Turkey	Turkey
12	Saudi Arabia	Spain	Spain	Indonesia	Indonesia	Indonesia	Mexico	Mexico	Mexico	Italy	Italy	South Korea
13	Canada	Canada	Canada	Spain	Spain	Spain	South Korea	South Korea	South Korea	Mexico	South Korea	Italy
14	China	Saudi Arabia	Indonesia	Saudi Arabia	Canada	South Korea	Spain	Turkey	Turkey	South Korea	Mexico	Mexico
15	Argentina	Indonesia	Turkey	Canada	South Korea	Canada	Saudi Arabia	Saudi Arabia	Spain	Spain	Saudi Arabia	Saudi Arabia
16	Poland	Iran	Saudi Arabia	South Korea	Saudi Arabia	Saudi Arabia	Iran	Spain	Canada	Canada	Spain	Egypt
17	Netherlands	Turkey	Iran	Turkey	Turkey	Iran	Canada	Canada	Saudi Arabia	Saudi Arabia	Egypt	Spain
18	Iran	Argentina	South Korea	Iran	Iran	Turkey	Turkey	Iran	Egypt	Egypt	Canada	Canada
19	Indonesia	Netherlands	Netherlands	Ukraine	Netherlands	Australia	Nigeria	Nigeria	Nigeria	Nigeria	Nigeria	Nigeria
20	Turkey	Australia	Australia	Thailand	Australia	Thailand	Australia	Thailand	Iran	Taiwan	Taiwan	Taiwan

== Statistical indicators ==
=== Finance ===
Countries or territories by GDP (PPP) per capita in 2021.: >$60,000 $50,000 – $60,000 $40,000 – $50,000 $30,000 – $40,000 / $20,000 – $30,000 $10,000 – $20,000 $5,000 – $10,000 $2,500 – $5,000 / $1,000 – $2,500 <$1,000 No data

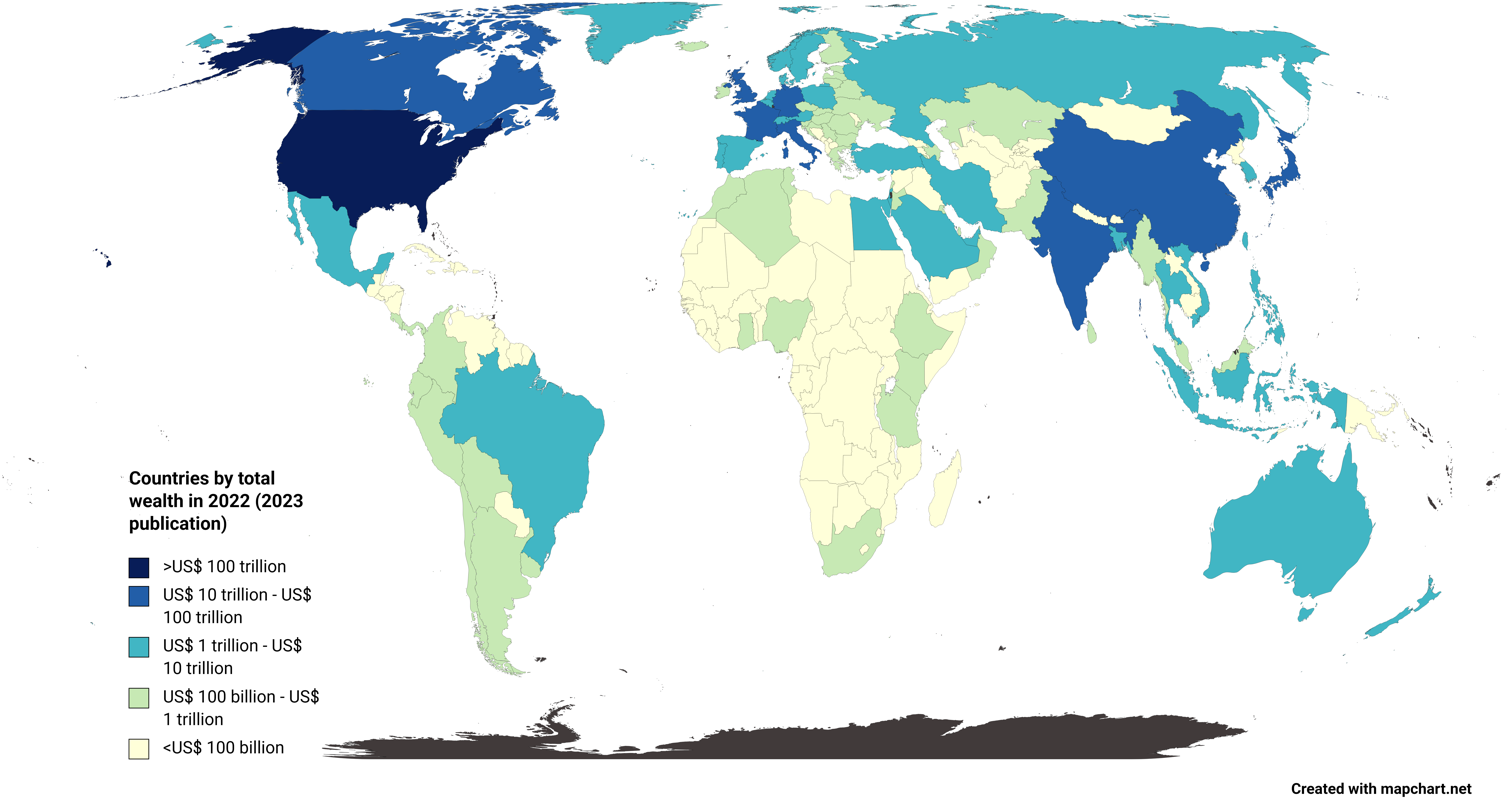
Countries by total wealth (trillions USD), Credit Suisse

- GDP (GWP) (gross world product): (purchasing power parity exchange rates) – $110.06 trillion (2025 estimate), $117.165 trillion (2023) . The GWP is the combined gross national income of all the countries in the world. When calculating the GWP, add GDP of all countries. Also, GWP shows that imports and exports are equal. Because imports and exports balance exactly when considering the whole world, this also equals the total global gross domestic product (GDP).
- GDP (GWP) (gross world product): (market exchange rates) – $60.69 trillion (2008). The market exchange rates increased from 1990 to 2008. The reason for this increase is the world's advancement in terms of technology.
- GDP (real growth rate): The following part shows the GDP growth rate and the expected value after one year.
  - Developed Economies. A developed country, industrialized country, more developed country (MDC), or more economically developed country (MEDC), is a sovereign state that has a developed economy and advanced technological infrastructure relative to other less industrialized nations. Most commonly, the criteria for evaluating the degree of economic development are gross domestic product (GDP), gross national product (GNP), the per capita income, level of industrialization, amount of widespread infrastructure and general standard of living. Which criteria are to be used and which countries can be classified as being developed are subjects of debate. The GDP of the developed countries is predicted to fall from 2.2% in 2017 to 2.0% in 2018 due to the fall in dollar value.
  - Developing Countries. A developing country is a country with a less developed industrial base (industries) and a low Human Development Index (HDI) relative to other countries. However, this definition is not universally agreed upon. There is also no clear agreement on which countries fit this category. A nation's GDP per capita, compared with other nations, can also be a reference point. In general, the United Nations accepts any country's claim of itself being "developing". The GDP of the developing countries is expected to rise from 4.3% in 2017 to 4.6% in 2018 due to political stability in those countries and advancement in technology.
  - Least developed countries. The least developed countries (LDCs) is a list of developing countries that, according to the United Nations, exhibit the lowest indicators of socioeconomic development, with the lowest Human Development Index ratings of all countries in the world. The concept of LDCs originated in the late 1960s and the first group of LDCs was listed by the UN in its resolution 2768 (XXVI) of 18 November 1971. This is a group of countries that are expected to improve their GDP from 4.8% in 2017 to 5.4% in 2018. The predicted growth is associated advancement in technology and industrialization of those countries for the past decade.
- GDP – per capita: purchasing power parity – $9,300, €7,500 (2005 est.), $8,200, €6,800 (92) (2003), $7,900, €5,000 (2002)
- World median income: purchasing power parity $1,041, €950 (1993)
- GDP – composition by sector: agriculture: 4%; industry: 32%; services: 64% (2004 est.)
- Inflation rate (consumer prices); In economics, inflation is a general rise in the price level in an economy over a period of time, resulting in a sustained drop in the purchasing power of money. When the general price level rises, each unit of currency buys fewer goods and services; consequently, inflation reflects a reduction in the purchasing power per unit of money – a loss of real value in the medium of exchange and unit of account within the economy. The opposite of inflation is deflation, a sustained decrease in the general price level of goods and services. The common measure of inflation is the inflation rate, the annualized percentage change in a general price index, usually the consumer price index, over time. national inflation rates vary widely in individual cases, from declining prices in Japan to hyperinflation (In economics, hyperinflation is very high and typically accelerating inflation) in several Third World countries (2003):
  - World 2.6% (2017), 2.8% (predicted 2018);
  - Developed Economies 1% to 4% typically
  - Developing Countries 5% to 60% typically
  - Least developed countries 11.4% (2017), 8.3% (predicted 2018)
- Derivatives OTC outstanding notional amount: $601 trillion (Dec 2010) ()
- Derivatives exchange traded outstanding notional amount: $82 trillion (June 2011) ()
- Global debt issuance: $5.187 trillion, €3 trillion (2004), $4.938 trillion, €3.98 trillion (2003), $3.938 trillion (2002) (Thomson Financial League Tables)
- Global equity issuance: $505 billion, €450 billion (2004), $388 billion. €320 billion (2003), $319 billion, €250 trillion (2002) (Thomson Financial League Tables)

=== Employment ===
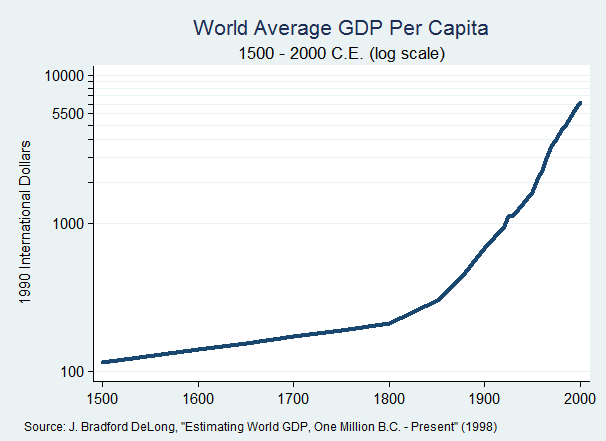
World GDP per capita between 1500 and 2000 (log scale)

World GDP per capita between 1500 and 2003

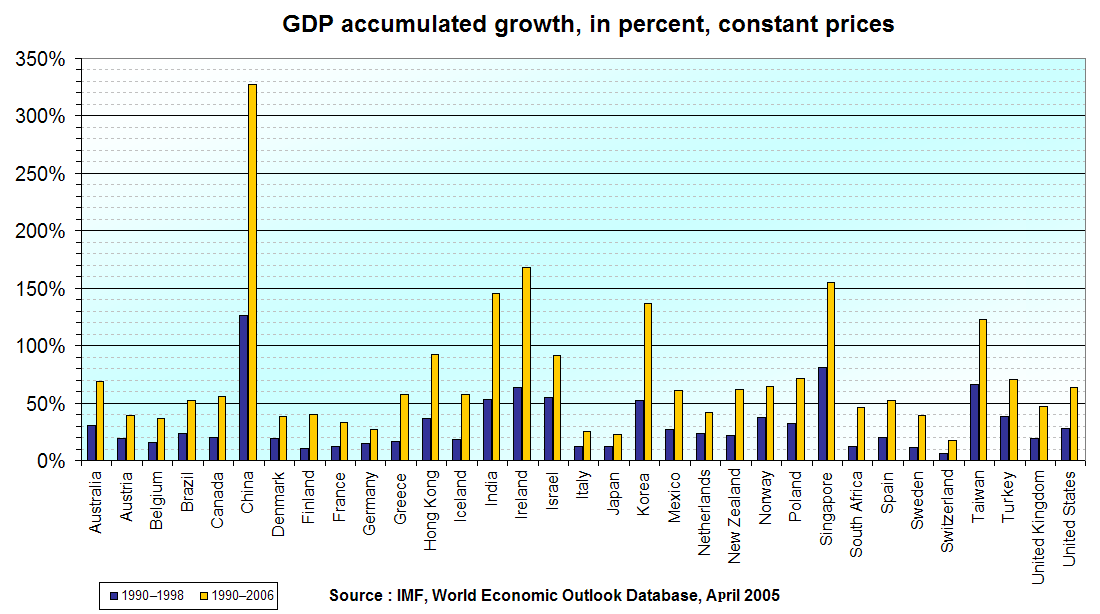
GDP increase, 1990–1998 and 1990–2006, in major countries

- Unemployment rate: 8.7% (2009 est.). 30% (2007 est.) combined unemployment and underemployment in many non-industrialized countries; developed countries typically 4%–12% unemployment.

=== Industries ===
- Industrial production growth rate: 3% (2002 est.)

=== Energy ===
Global primary energy consumption, measured in terawatt-hours (TWh) per year

- Yearly electricity – production: 21,080,878 GWh (2011 est.), 15,850,000 GWh (2003 est.), 14,850,000 GWh (2001 est.)
- Yearly electricity – consumption: 14,280,000 GWh (2003 est.), 13,930,000 GWh (2001 est.)
- Oil – production: 79,650,000 bbl/d (12,663,000 m^{3}/d) (2003 est.), 75,460,000 barrels per day (11,997,000 m^{3}/d) (2001)
- Oil – consumption: 80,100,000 bbl/d (12,730,000 m^{3}/d) (2003 est.), 76,210,000 barrels per day (12,116,000 m^{3}/d) (2001)
- Oil – proved reserves: 1.025 trillion barrel (163 km^{3} (39 cu mi) (2001 est.)
- Natural gas – production: 3,366 km^{3} (808 cu mi) (2012 est.), 2,569 km^{3} (616 cu mi) (2001 est.)
- Natural gas – consumption: 2,556 km^{3} (613 cu mi) (2001 est.)
- Natural gas – proved reserves: 161,200 km^{3} (38,700 cu mi) (1 January 2002)

=== Cross-border ===
- Yearly exports: $12.4 trillion, €11.05 trillion (2009 est.)
- Exports – commodities: the whole range of industrial and agricultural goods and services
- Exports – partners: US 12.7%, Germany 7.1%, China 6.2%, France 4.4%, Japan 4.2%, UK 4.1% (2008)
- Yearly imports: $12.29 trillion, €10.95 trillion (2009 est.)
- Imports – commodities: the whole range of industrial and agricultural goods and services
- Imports – partners: China 10.3%, Germany 8.6%, US 8.1%, Japan 5% (2008)
- Debt – external: $56.9 trillion, €40 trillion (31 December 2009 est.)

=== Gift economy ===
- Annual international aid: Official Development Assistance (ODA) of $204 billion (2022)

=== Communications ===
Telephones – main lines in use: 843,923,500 (2007)
4,263,367,600 (2008)

- Telephones – mobile cellular: 3,300,000,000 (Nov. 2007)
- Internet service providers (ISPs): 10,350 (2000 est.)
- Internet users: 3,079,339,857 (31 December 2014 ), 360,985,492 (31 December 2000)

=== Transport ===
Transportation infrastructure worldwide includes:

- Airports
  - Total: 41,821 (2013)
- Roadways
  - Total: 32,345,165 km (20,098,354 mi)
  - Paved: 19,403,061 km (12,056,503 mi)
  - Unpaved: 12,942,104 km (8,041,851 mi) (2002)
- Railways
  - Total: 1,122,650 km (697,580 mi) includes about 190,000 to 195,000 km (118,000 to 121,000 mi) of electrified routes of which 147,760 km (91,810 mi) are in Europe, 24,509 km (15,229 mi) in the Far East, 11,050 km (6,870 mi) in Africa, 4,223 km (2,624 mi) in South America, and 4,160 km (2,580 mi) in North America.

=== Military ===
- World military expenditure in 2018: estimated to $1.822 trillion
- Military expenditures – percent of GDP: roughly 2% of gross world product (1999).

Further information: List of countries with highest military expenditures

Military spending, top 25 countries by % GDP, 2024
Country	% GDP spent on military
Ukraine	34.5
Israel	8.8
Algeria	8.0
Saudi Arabia	7.3
Russia	7.1
Myanmar	6.8
Oman	5.6
Armenia	5.5
Azerbaijan	5.0
Kuwait	4.8
Jordan	4.8
Burkina Faso	4.7
Mali	4.2
Poland	4.2
Burundi	3.8
Brunei	3.6
Morocco	3.5
United States	3.4
Estonia	3.4
Colombia	3.4
Latvia	3.3
Greece	3.1
Lithuania	3.1
Chad	3.0
Kyrgyzstan	3.0

Military spending, top 25 countries by PPP, 2024
Country	$billions spent on military
United States	997
China	567
Russia	401
India	308
Ukraine	183
South Korea	96
Germany	99
Japan	91
France	91
United Kingdom	86
Brazil	64
Poland	62
Italy	60
Turkey	59
Indonesia	47
Colombia	43
Mexico	40
Spain	39
Australia	31
Canada	31
Netherlands	21
Philippines	21
Romania	21
Greece	17
Malaysia	14

=== Science, research and development ===
Number of scientific or technical journal article publications per million residents as of 2013.

The Royal Society in a 2011 report stated that in terms of number of papers the share of English-language scientific research papers the United States was first followed by China, the UK, Germany, Japan, France, and Canada. In 2015, research and development constituted an average 2.2% of the global GDP according to the UNESCO Institute for Statistics. Metrics and rankings of innovation include the Bloomberg Innovation Index, the Global Innovation Index and the share of Nobel laureates per capita.

=== Resources and environment ===
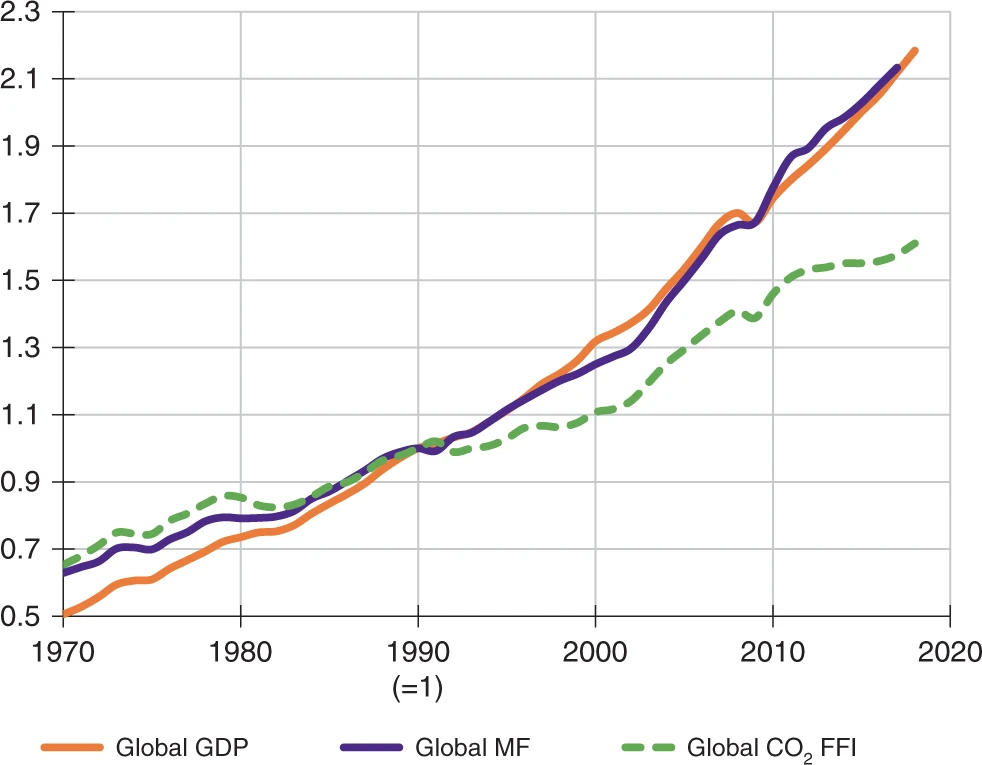
Shown is how the global material footprint and global CO2 emissions from fossil-fuel combustion and industrial processes changed compared with global GDP.

The period since 1950 has brought "the most rapid transformation of the human relationship with the natural world in the history of humankind". Through 2018, humans have reduced forest area by ~30% and grasslands/shrubs by ~68%, to make way for livestock grazing and crops for humans.

- Forests (carbon sinks, wood, ecosystem services, ...)
  - Estimated number of trees that are net lost annually as of 2021: 10 billion
  - Global annual deforested land in 2015–2020: 10 million hectares
  - Global annual net forest area loss in 2000–2010 : 4.7 million hectares
- Other land degradation and land- and organisms-related ecosystem disturbances
  - Soils (carbon sink, ecosystem services, food production, ...)
    - Soil erosion by water in 2012: almost 36 billion tons (based on a high resolution global potential soil erosion model developed in 2017)
    - Estimated annual loss of agricultural productivity due to soil erosion: 8 billion US dollars (based on the soil erosion data)
    - Soil erosion by water in 2015: approximately 43 billion tons (according to a 2020 study)
    - Environmental impact of pesticides
      - Pesticide use in tonnes of active ingredient in Australia in 2016: ca. 62,500 tonnes
- Oceans (ecosystem services, food production, ...): Blue economy
- Waste and pollution (effects of economic mechanisms, effects on ecosystem services)
  - As of 2018, about 380 million tonnes of plastic is produced worldwide each year. From the 1950s up to 2018, an estimated 6.3 billion tonnes of plastic has been produced worldwide, of which an estimated 9% has been recycled and another 12% has been incinerated with the rest reportedly being "dumped in landfills or the natural environment".
  - Air pollution
    - Number of human deaths caused annually by air pollution worldwide: ca. 7 million
    - Estimated global annual cost of air pollution: $5 trillion
  - Microplastic pollution
    - Estimated accumulated number of microplastic particles in the North Atlantic Ocean in 2014: 15 to 51 trillion particles, weighing between 93,000 and 236,000 metric tons
    - Estimated accumulated number of microplastic particles in the North Atlantic Ocean in 2020: 3700 microplastics per cubic meter

From the scientific perspective, economic activities are embedded in a web of dynamic, interrelated, and interdependent activities that constitute the natural system of Earth. Novel application of cybernetics in decision-making (such as in decision-making related to process- and product-design and related laws) and direction of human activity (such as economic activity) may make it easier to control modern ecological problems.

== Historical development ==
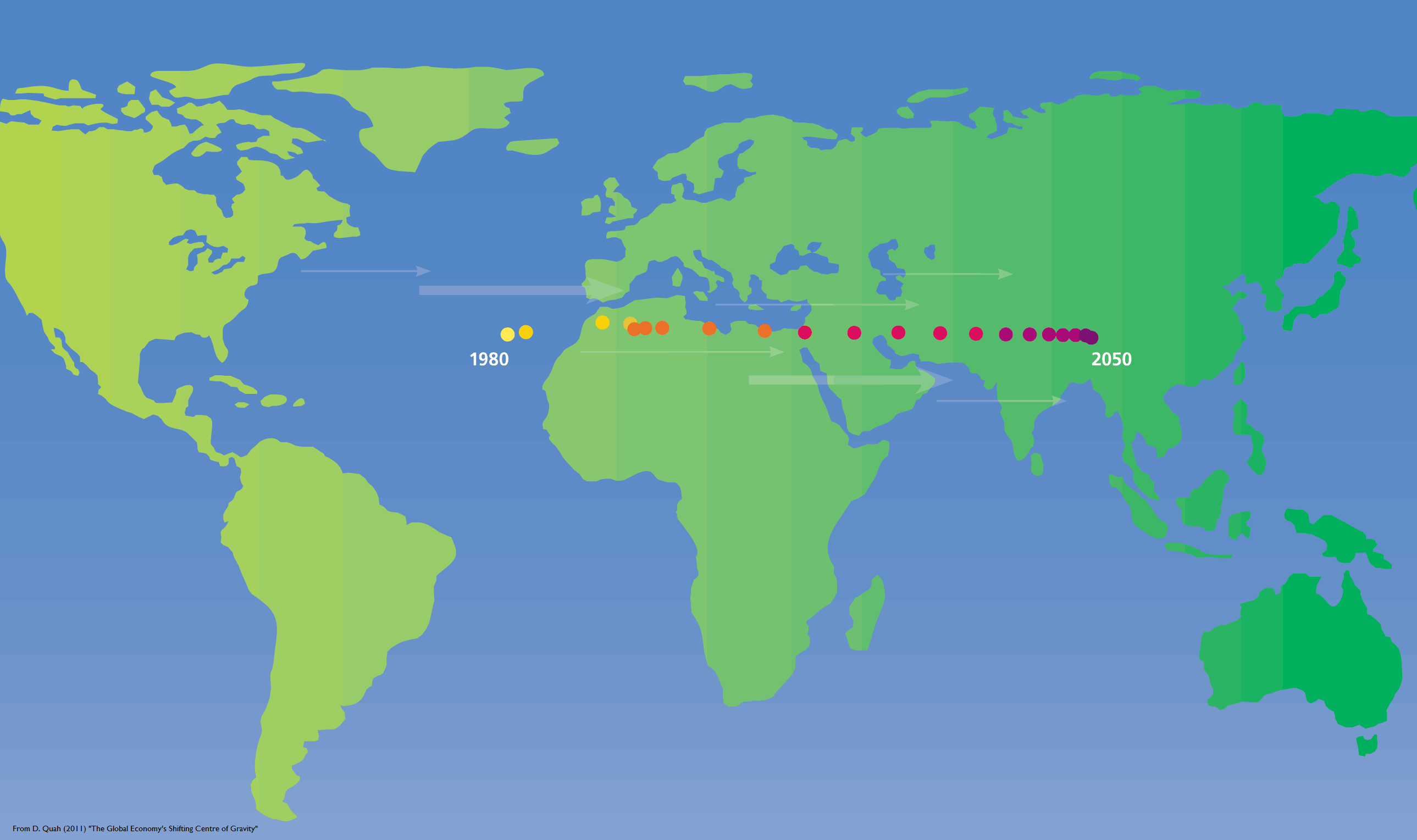
Shift of the world's economic center of gravity since 1980 and projected until 2050

Estimations of world population and GDP from a 2020 research paper
Year	Population (million)	GDP per capita ($1990 in PPP)	GDP in billion ($1990 in PPP)
1000000 BCE	0.125	400	0.05
300000 BCE	1	400	0.40
25000 BCE	3.34	400	1.34
10000 BCE	4	400	1.60
5000 BCE	5	404	2.02
4000 BCE	7	409	2.87
3000 BCE	14	421	5.90
2000 BCE	27	433	11.7
1000 BCE	50	444	22.2
500 BCE	100	457	45.7
200 BCE	150	465	69.7
1	168	467	78.4
200	190	463	88.0
400	190	463	88.0
500	190	463	88.0
600	200	462	92.3
700	210	460	96.6
800	220	459	101
900	240	456	109
1000	265	453	120
1100	320	512	164
1200	360	551	198
1300	360	551	198
1400	350	541	190
1500	438	625	274
1600	556	629	350
1700	603	658	397
1820	1,042	712	741
1870	1,276	884	1,128
1900	1,563		
1913	1,793	1,543	2,767
1920	1,863		
1940	2,299	2,181	5,013
1950	2,528	2,104	5,318
1960	3,042	2,764	12,170
1970	3,691	3,725	13,751
1980	4,440	4,511	20,026
1990	5,269	5,149	27,133
2000	6,077	6,057	36,806
2010	6,873	7,814	53,704
2019	7,620	9,663	73,640

Per the MSCI All Country World Index, the breakdown of market sector is as follows:

Sector	2012	2022
Energy	10.7	4.4
Materials	8.2	5.5
Industrials	11.5	10.6
Consumer Discretionary	11.2	11.7
Consumer Staples	9.4	6.6
Healthcare	8.8	11.6
Financials	19.5	14.4
Information Technology	13.1	21.2
Communication Service	4.0	7.5
Utilities	3.6	2.9
Real Estate		3.6

One example for a comparable metric other than GDP are the OECD Better Life Index rankings for different aggregative domains.

Legend
Explained by: Housing Explained by: Income Explained by: Jobs	Explained by: Community Explained by: Education Explained by: Environment	Explained by: Civic engagement Explained by: Health Explained by: Life Satisfaction	Explained by: Safety Explained by: Work-Life Balance

OECD Better Life Index rankings for 2016
Overall Rank	Country	Housing	Income	Jobs	Community	Education	Environment	Civic engagement	Health	Life Satisfaction	Safety	Work-Life Balance
1	Norway											
2	Australia											
3	Denmark											
4	Switzerland											
5	Canada											
6	Sweden											
7	New Zealand											
8	Finland											
9	United States											
10	Iceland											
11	Netherlands											
12	Germany											
13	Luxembourg											
14	Belgium											
15	Austria											
16	United Kingdom											
17	Ireland											
18	France											
19	Spain											
20	Slovenia											
21	Czech Republic											
22	Estonia											
23	Japan											
24	Slovakia											
25	Italy											
26	Israel											
27	Poland											
28	South Korea											
29	Portugal											
30	Latvia											
31	Greece											
32	Hungary											
33	Russia											
34	Chile											
35	Brazil											
36	Turkey											
37	Mexico											
38	South Africa											

The index includes 11 comparable "dimensions" of well-being:

1. Housing: housing conditions and spendings (e.g. real estate pricing)
2. Income: household income (after taxes and transfers) and net financial wealth
3. Jobs: earnings, job security and unemployment
4. Community: quality of social support network
5. Education: education and what one gets out of it
6. Environment: quality of environment (e.g. environmental health)
7. Governance: involvement in democracy
8. Health
9. Life Satisfaction: level of happiness
10. Safety: murder and assault rates
11. Work-life balance

== Economic studies ==
To promote exports, many government agencies publish on the web economic studies by sector and country. Among these agencies include the USCS (US DoC) and FAS (USDA) in the United States, the EDC and AAFC in Canada, Ubifrance in France, the UKTI in the United Kingdom, the HKTDC and JETRO in Asia, Austrade and the NZTE in Oceania. Through Partnership Agreements, the Federation of International Trade Associations publishes studies from several of these agencies (USCS, FAS, AAFC, UKTI, and HKTDC) as well as other non-governmental organizations on its website globaltrade.net.

== See also ==
- Anarchy (international relations)
- Capitalism
- Common Wealth: Economics for a Crowded Planet (book)
- Economic bubble
- Economic collapse
- Fourth Industrial Revolution
- Global financial system
- Global workforce
- Globality
- Globalization
- International trade
- Trade route
- Overconsumption
- Petrodollar recycling
- World Trade Report
- World history
  - Economic history of the world
- World-systems theory

Regional economies:

- Economy of Africa
- Economy of Asia
- Economy of Europe
- Economy of North America
- Economy of Oceania
- Economy of South America

Events:

- Great Recession
- World oil market chronology from 2003
- 2008 financial crisis
- 2007–2008 world food price crisis
- Economic impact of the COVID-19 pandemic

Lists:

- List of countries by GDP sector composition
- List of world's largest economies (nominal) – based on current currency market exchange rates
- List of world's largest economies (PPP) – based on purchasing power parity
- Historical list of world's largest economies (PPP) – for the years between 1 and 1998
