= Commonwealth Building =

Commonwealth Building may refer to:

- Commonwealth Building (Louisville)
- Commonwealth Building (Pittsburgh)
- Commonwealth Building (Portland, Oregon)

== See also ==
- Commonwealth (disambiguation)
