= Commonwealth Avenue =

Commonwealth Avenue may refer to:

- Commonwealth Avenue (Boston), Massachusetts, United States
- Commonwealth Avenue (Canberra), Australia
- Commonwealth Avenue, Hillingdon, London, England, United Kingdom
- Commonwealth Avenue, Merrick, New York, United States
- Commonwealth Avenue (Quezon City), Philippines
- Commonwealth Avenue, Shepherd's Bush, London, England, United Kingdom
- Commonwealth Avenue, Singapore

== See also ==
- Commonwealth (disambiguation)
- Commonwealth Avenue Historic District (disambiguation)
