= Petroyuan =

Oil transaction valued in yuan

Petroyuan is a form of the official Chinese currency, the yuan intended at least initially for oil trading. On 26 March 2018, the Chinese government issued the first long term oil trading contracts denominated in petroyuans. This project exists to attempt to compete with the U.S. petrodollar as a main currency in crude oil transactions, whose hegemony has led the market since the dollar standard was first established in 1971, replacing the gold standard and giving the United States the power to manage most of the world's currency supply (around ~60%).

== History ==
Since 1971, when U.S. President Richard Nixon ended the dollar convertibility to gold, many foreign currencies emerged trying to replicate the pre-1971 situation. An example of a petrocurrency backed by gold was a project by the Libyan leader Muammar Gaddafi, who released a project to create a multinational African currency, However, this project was discarded because he was overthrown by the United States and its allies during the 2011 military intervention in Libya.

China, with a currency constantly growing on market relevance, attempted to create a dollar alternative. In June 2017, the People's Bank of China and the Central Bank of Russia signed a memorandum to facilitate the exchange of crude oil using yuans. Months later, in September 2017, China made official the existence of the petroyuan.

The operation was given on a context where China dominated crude oil importations, with approximately 400 million tons as of 2017 as stated by Sinopec, one of China's biggest oil companies.

== Characteristics ==
One of the reasons the petroyuan was created was that Russia, Venezuela and Iran may be able to avoid the United States' sanctions, so nations such as Saudi Arabia, one of the main oil producers and extractors could avoid dollar hegemony and U.S. pressure. The yuan's main problems are its volatile liquidity and short scale extension, however the Chinese government intervened increasing its gold reserves to back the petroyuan.

== See also ==
- Petro (token) – Venezuelan cryptocurrency
