= Co-operative Commonwealth =

Co-operative Commonwealth may refer to:

- Co-operative Commonwealth (society), a society based on cooperative and socialist principles
- Co-operative Commonwealth Federation, a defunct Canadian political party (now known as the New Democratic Party
- The Co-operative Commonwealth in its Outlines, An Exposition of Modern Socialism, an 1884 treatise by Laurence Gronlund

== See also ==
- Commonwealth (disambiguation)
- Cooperative (disambiguation)
