= Commonwealth College =

Commonwealth College may refer to the following American schools:

- Commonwealth College (Arkansas)
- The Commonwealth Medical College in Pennsylvania
- Commonwealth Honors College, at the University of Massachusetts Amherst

== See also ==
- Commonwealth (disambiguation)
