= Commonwealth District =

Commonwealth District may refer to:

- Commonwealth District, Grand Bassa County, Liberia
- Commonwealth District, Grand Cape Mount County, Liberia
- Commonwealth District, Montserrado County, Liberia
- Commonwealth District (VHSL), a high school sports conference in Virginia, United States

== See also ==
- Commonwealth (disambiguation)
