= Commonwealth Avenue Historic District (North Attleborough, Massachusetts) =

Historic district in Massachusetts, United States

- U.S. National Register of Historic Places
- U.S. Historic district
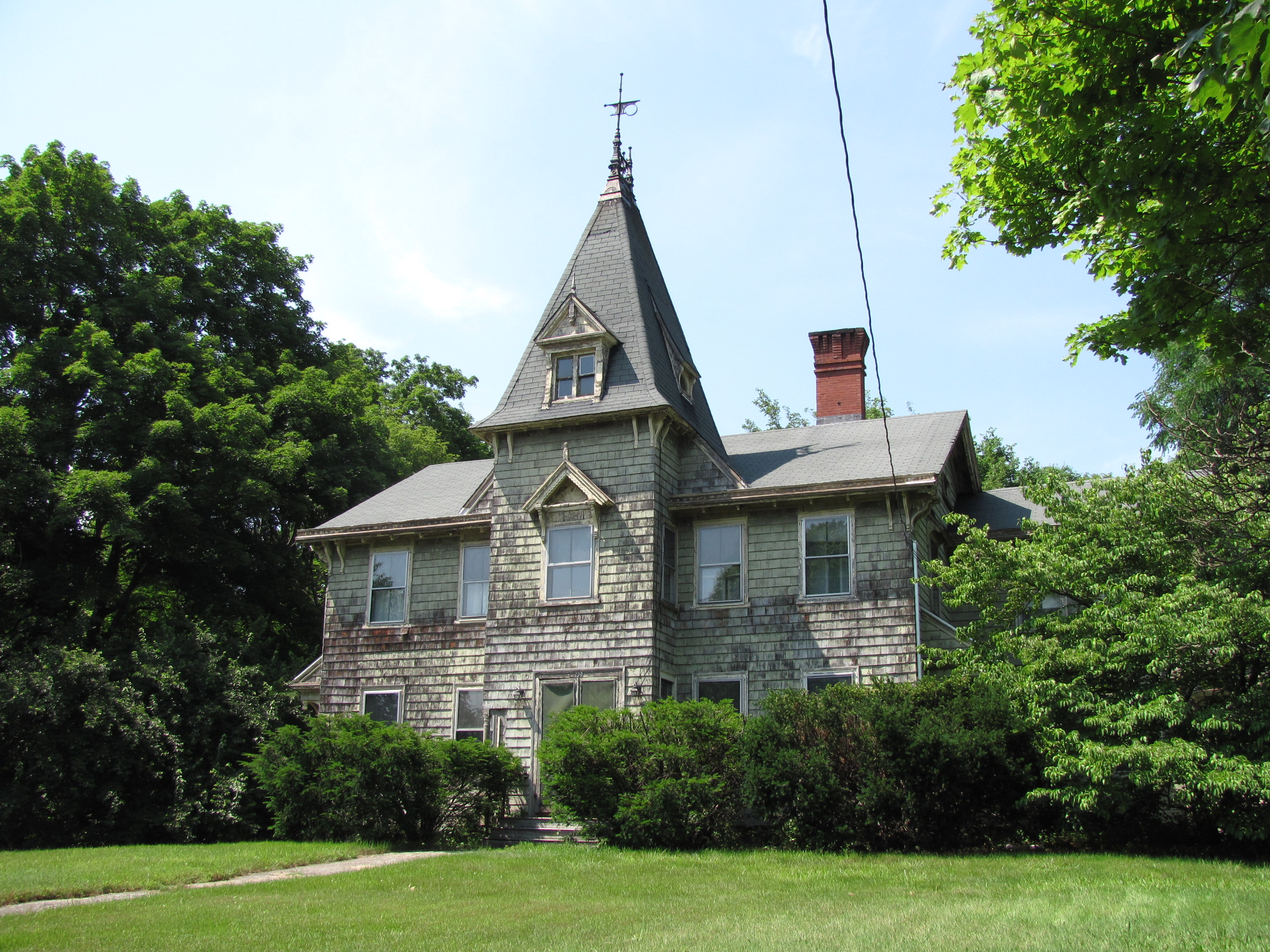
- 188 Commonwealth Avenue

- Location within Massachusetts Location within the United States
- Location: North Attleborough, Massachusetts
- Coordinates: 41°58′11″N 71°18′37″W
- Area: 12.5 acres (5.1 ha)
- Architect: Wheeler, E.R.; Field, Frank E.
- NRHP reference No.: 03001261
- Added to NRHP: December 12, 2003

The Commonwealth Avenue Historic District is a historic district on Commonwealth Avenue on the north side from Stanley Street to beyond Robinson Street in North Attleborough, Massachusetts. The area encompasses a variety of stylish 19th-century houses, as well as two 19th-century industrial buildings, depicting the proximity of wealthy industrial owners and managers to their factories. The district was added to the National Register of Historic Places in 2003.

== Description and history ==
Commonwealth Avenue runs east-west through the Attleborough Falls section of North Attleborough, one of its principal industrial areas in the 19th century, and originally connected the town centers of North Attleborough and Attleboro. Its western portion, between Mt. Hope Street and Robinson Avenue, roughly parallels the Ten Mile River, the power source for the industries during that time. The area has been industrially significant since the early 18th century, when a grist mill was operated near the falls. Industrial activity became more intense in the early 19th century, with the construction of the nation's first button-making factory in 1809, and a number of jewelry-related industries followed.

Robinson Avenue and the area just to its west was the site of several early factories. A wood frame factory stands at 35 Robinson Avenue, which was home to the B. S. Freeman Company, a jewelry maker, between 1858 and 1913; it may incorporate elements of an even older building in its rambling structure. A second jewelry factory, at 140 Commonwealth Avenue, was built in 1858 by V. H. Blackington. Both of the owners of these factories lived not far away, Blackington within this district at 172 Commonwealth Avenue, and Freeman lived to the west on Mt. Hope Street, in an area that is part of the Attleborough Falls Historic District. Later factory owners continued this trend, with Samuel Mason, a boxmaker, building a Gothic Revival house at 204 Commonwealth, and jewelry maker Frank Sturdy a Queen Anne Victorian at 234 Commonwealth.

== See also ==
- National Register of Historic Places listings in Bristol County, Massachusetts
