= Commonwealth Brigade =

Commonwealth Brigade may refer to two joint Commonwealth of Nations units during the Korean War:

- 27th Infantry Brigade (United Kingdom), also known as the 27th British Commonwealth Brigade
- 28th Infantry Brigade (United Kingdom), also known as the 28th Commonwealth Brigade
