= Commonwealth Conference =

Commonwealth Conference may refer to:

- Meetings of the Commonwealth of Nations in particular:
  - Commonwealth Prime Ministers' Conferences (1944-1969)
  - Commonwealth Heads of Government Meetings (since 1971)
  - Commonwealth Parliamentary Association Conferences
- MAC Commonwealth Conference, an intercollegiate athletic conference in the United States
- Commonwealth Athletic Conference, a high school athletic conference in Massachusetts
