= Commonwealth Club =

Commonwealth Club may refer to:

== Organizations ==
- Commonwealth Club of California, in San Francisco, America's oldest public affairs forum
- Commonwealth Club (Australia), a private members' club in Canberra founded by Frank Lukis
- The Commonwealth Club, a private gentlemen's club in Richmond, Virginia, US
- Commonwealth Club, formerly a private members' club of the Royal Commonwealth Society

== See also ==
- Commonwealth Club Address, a 1932 speech by presidential candidate Franklin Roosevelt
- Commonwealth Jazz Club, a 1965 music television miniseries co-produced in Australia, Canada and the UK
- Commonwealth Golf Club, in Oakleigh South, Victoria, Australia
