= Commonwealth Bank building =

Commonwealth Bank building may refer to:

- Commonwealth Bank Building, Gladstone, Queensland
- Commonwealth Bank Building, Mackay, Queensland
- Commonwealth Bank Building, Mount Morgan, Queensland
- Commonwealth Bank Building, Townsville, Queensland
- Commonwealth Trading Bank Building, Sydney, New South Wales
