= Common Wealth: Economics for a Crowded Planet =

Common Wealth
- Author: Jeffrey D. Sachs
- Cover artist: Nicole Laroche
- Language: English
- Subject: Economics
- Publisher: The Penguin Press
- Publication date: 2008
- Publication place: United States
- Media type: Print (hardback)
- Pages: 340
- ISBN: 978-1-59420-127-1

Common Wealth: Economics for a Crowded Planet is a 2008 New York Times bestseller book by economist Jeffrey Sachs. Sachs began promoting electric vehicles (PHEVs) in this book. In this book, Sachs states that the world of economics does not depend on the law of market-determined supply and demand.
