= Petrodollar recycling =

International spending of petroleum export revenues

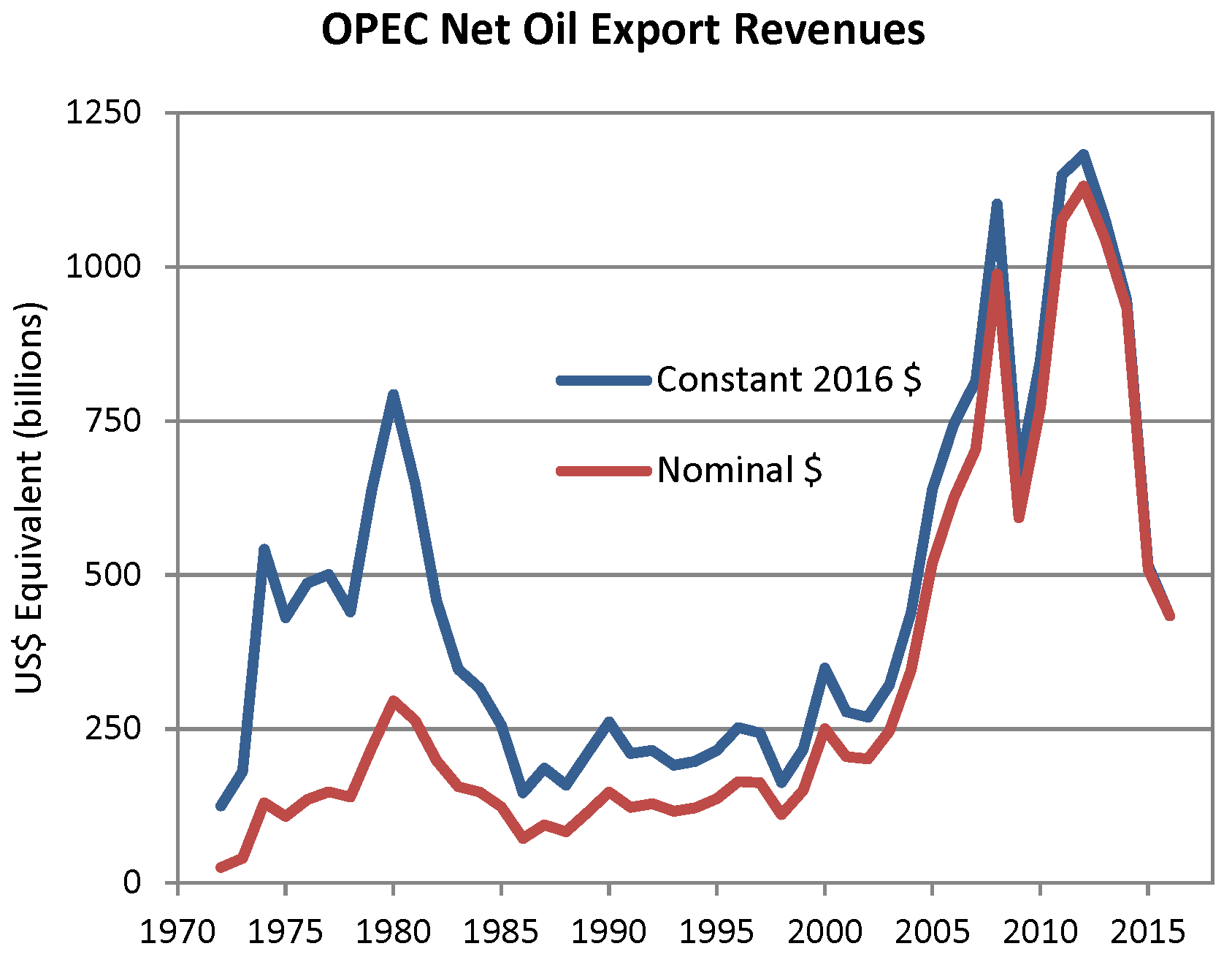
Fluctuations of OPEC net oil export revenues since 1972, showing elevated inflation-adjusted levels during 1974–1981 and 2005–2014

Petrodollar recycling is the international spending or investment of a country's revenues in U.S. dollars from petroleum exports ("petrodollars"). It generally refers to the phenomenon of major petroleum-exporting states, mainly the OPEC members plus Russia and Norway, earning more money from the export of crude oil than they could efficiently invest in their own economies. The resulting global interdependencies and financial flows, from oil producers back to oil consumers, can reach a scale of hundreds of billions of U.S. dollars per year – including a wide range of transactions in a variety of currencies, some pegged to the U.S. dollar and some not. These flows are heavily influenced by government-level decisions regarding international investment and aid, with important consequences for both global finance and petroleum politics. The phenomenon is most pronounced during periods when the price of oil is historically high.

The term petrodollar was coined in the early 1970s during the oil crisis, and the first major petrodollar surge (1974–1981) resulted in more financial complications than the second (2005–2014).

== Capital flows ==
=== Background ===
Especially during the years 1974–1981 and 2005–2014, oil exporters amassed large surpluses of "petrodollars" from the sale of oil at historically high prices. (The word has been credited alternately to Egyptian-American economist Ibrahim Oweiss and to former U.S. Secretary of Commerce Peter G. Peterson, both in 1973.) These petrodollar surpluses could be described as net U.S. dollar-equivalents earned from the export of petroleum, in excess of the internal development needs of the exporting countries. The International Monetary Fund argues that these surpluses could not be efficiently invested in their own economies, due to small populations or being at early stages of industrialization. Instead, the IMF advocated for the surpluses to be invested in other locations, most notably the United States, or spent on imports such as consumer products, construction supplies, and military equipment. Additionally, the IMF also argues that global economic growth would have suffered if money was withdrawn from the world economy and stored in the reserves of developing nations, while the oil-exporting states needed to be able to invest profitably to raise their long-term standards of living. Alternatively, critics argue that the international monetary system, reliant on petrodollar recycling, exploits developing nations while advancing American imperialism.

=== 1974–1981 surge ===
While petrodollar recycling reduced the short-term recessionary impact of the 1973 oil crisis, it caused problems especially for oil-importing countries that were paying much higher prices for oil, and incurring long-term debts. The International Monetary Fund (IMF) estimated that the foreign debts of 100 oil-importing developing countries increased by 150% between 1973 and 1977, complicated further by a worldwide shift to floating exchange rates. Johan Witteveen, the Managing Director of the IMF, said in 1974: "The international monetary system is facing its most difficult period since the 1930s." The IMF administered a new lending program during 1974–1976 called the Oil Facility. Funded by oil-exporting states and other lenders, it was available to governments suffering from acute problems with their balance of trade due to the rise in oil prices, notably including Italy and the United Kingdom as well as dozens of developing countries.

From 1974 through 1981, the total current account surplus for all members of OPEC amounted to US$450 billion, without scaling-up for the subsequent decades of inflation. Ninety percent of this surplus was accumulated by the Arab countries of the Persian Gulf and Libya, with Iran also accumulating significant oil surpluses through 1978 before suffering the hardships of revolution, war and sanctions.

Large volumes of Arab petrodollars were invested directly in U.S. Treasury securities and in other financial markets of the major industrial economies, often directed discreetly by government entities now known as sovereign wealth funds. Many billions of petrodollars were also invested through the major commercial banks of the United States, European Union, Switzerland, and the United Kingdom. In fact, the process contributed to the growth of the Eurodollar market as a less-regulated rival to U.S. monetary markets. As the recessionary condition of the world economy made investment in corporations less attractive, bankers and well-financed governments lent much of the money directly to the governments of developing countries, especially in Latin America such as Brazil and Argentina as well as other major developing countries like Turkey. The 1973 oil crisis had created a vast dollar shortage in these countries; however, they still needed to finance their imports of oil and machinery. In early 1977, when Turkey stopped heating its prime minister's office, opposition leader Suleyman Demirel famously described the shortage as: "Turkey is in need of 70 cents." As political journalist William Greider summarized the situation: "Banks collected the deposits of revenue-rich OPEC governments and lent the money to developing countries so they could avoid bankruptcy." In subsequent decades, many of these developing states found their accumulated debts to be unpayably large, concluding that it was a form of neocolonialism from which debt relief was the only escape.

=== 2005–2014 surge ===
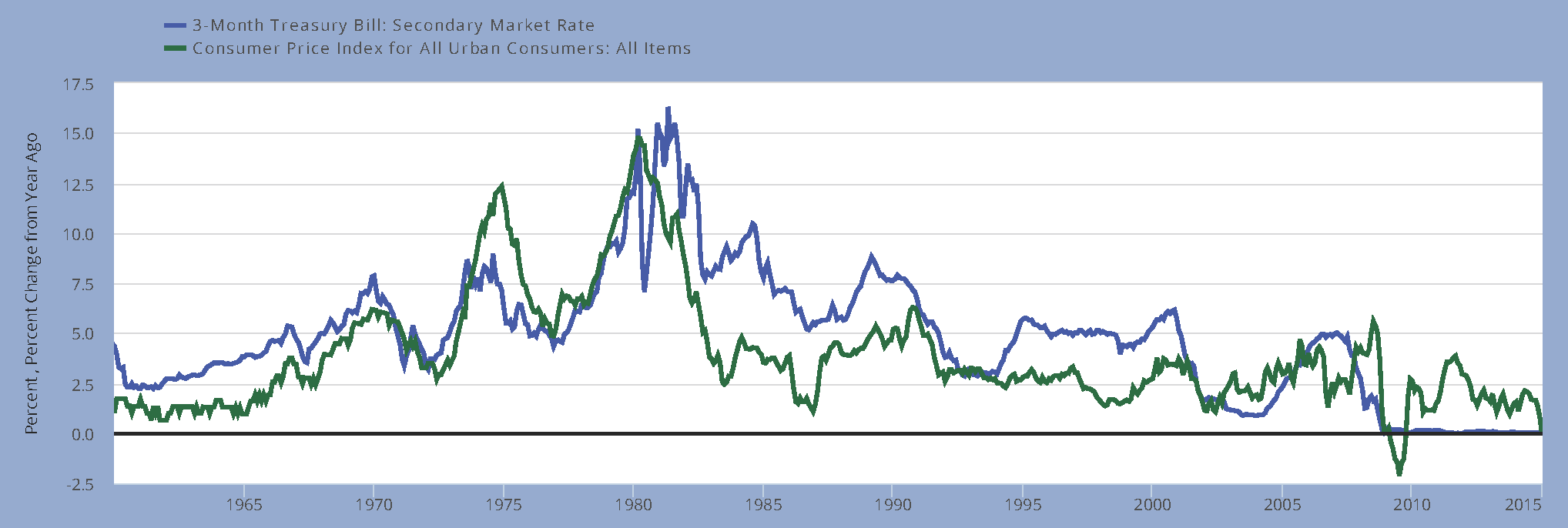
Inflation and interest rates surged with oil prices in the 1970s, but not in the 2000s.

In the 2005–2014 petrodollar surge, financial decision-makers were able to benefit somewhat from the lessons and experiences of the previous cycle. Developing economies generally stayed better balanced than they did in the 1970s; the world economy was less oil-intensive; and global inflation and interest rates were much better contained. Oil exporters opted to make most of their investments directly into a diverse array of global markets, and the recycling process was less dependent on intermediary channels such as international banks and the IMF.

Thanks to the historic oil price increases of 2003–2008, OPEC revenues approximated an unprecedented US$1 trillion per year in 2008 and 2011–2014. Beyond the OPEC countries, substantial surpluses also accrued to Russia and Norway, and sovereign wealth funds worldwide amassed US$7 trillion by 2014–2015. Some oil exporters were unable to reap the full benefits, as the national economies of Iran, Iraq, Libya, Nigeria and Venezuela all suffered from multi-year political obstacles associated with what economists call the "resource curse". Most of the other large exporters accumulated enough financial reserves to cushion the shock when oil prices and petrodollar surpluses fell sharply again from an oil supply glut in 2014–2017.

== Foreign aid ==
Oil-exporting countries have used part of their petrodollar surpluses to fund foreign aid programs, as a prominent example of so-called "checkbook diplomacy" or "petro-Islam". The Kuwait Fund was an early leader since 1961, and certain Arab states became some of the largest donors in the years since 1974, including through the IMF and the OPEC Fund for International Development. Oil exporters have also aided poorer countries indirectly through the personal remittances sent home by tens of millions of foreign workers in the Middle East, although their working conditions are generally harsh. Even more controversially, several oil exporters have been major financial supporters of armed groups challenging the governments of other countries.

High-priced oil allowed the USSR to support the struggling economies of the Soviet-led bloc during the 1974–1981 petrodollar surge, and the loss of income during the 1980s oil glut contributed to the bloc's collapse in 1989. During the 2005–2014 petrodollar surge, OPEC member Venezuela played a similar role supporting Cuba and other regional allies, before the 2014–2017 oil downturn brought Venezuela to its own economic crisis.

== Petrodollar warfare ==
The term petrodollar warfare refers to a theory that depicts the international use of the United States dollar as the standard means of settling oil transactions as a kind of economic imperialism enforced by violent military interventions against countries like Iraq, Iran, and Venezuela, and a key hidden driver of world politics. The term was coined by William R. Clark, who has written a book with the same title. The phrase oil currency war is sometimes used with the same meaning.

According to critics, the use of dollars in international oil transactions increases overall U.S. dollar demand by only a tiny fraction, and the dollar's overall status as the major international reserve currency has relatively limited tangible benefit to the United States economy as well as some drawbacks.

== Gallery of notable examples ==
These images illustrate the diversity of major petrodollar recycling activities, in roughly chronological order:

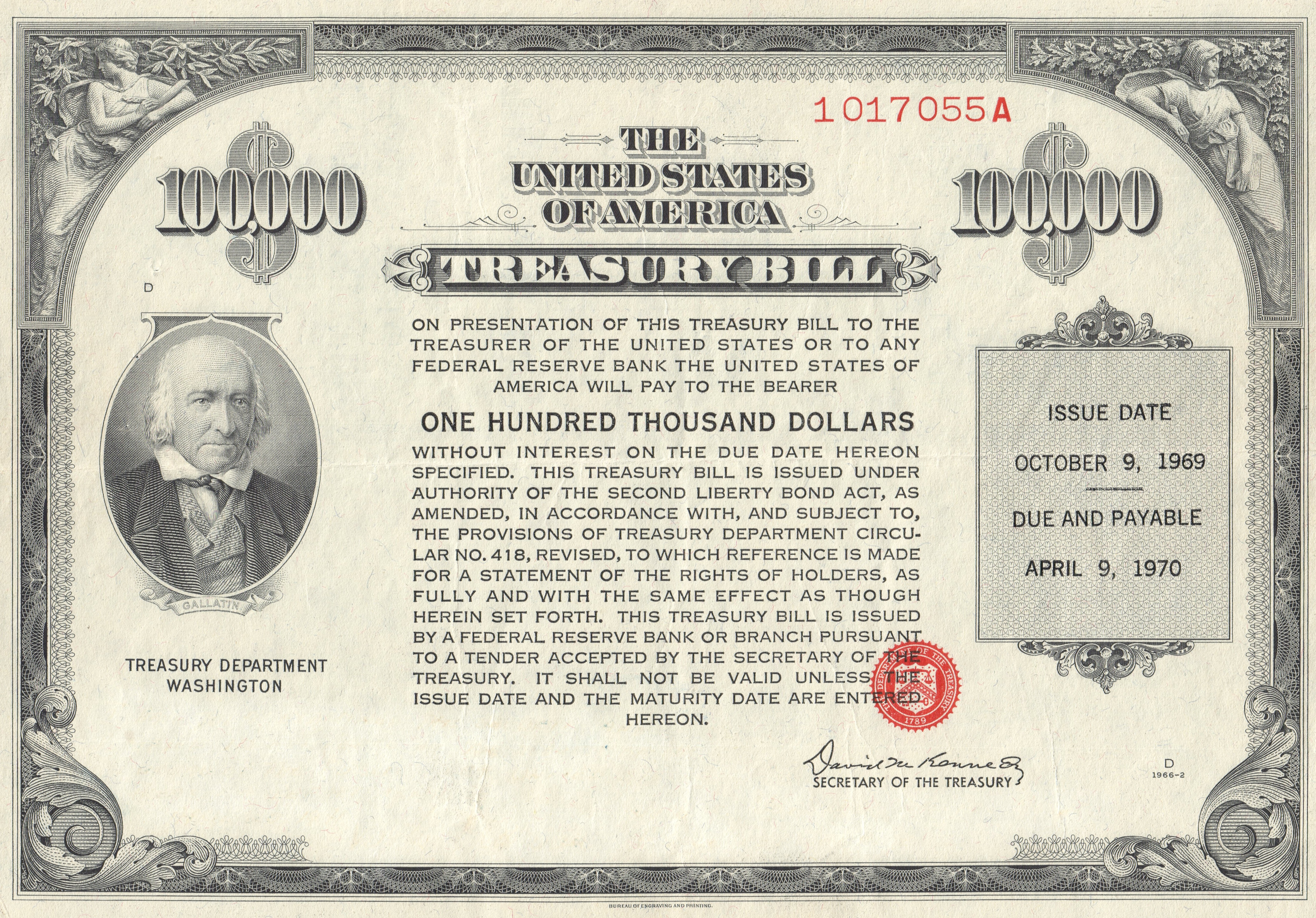
U.S. Treasury securities, approximately $300 billion accumulated by OPEC governments during 1960–2015

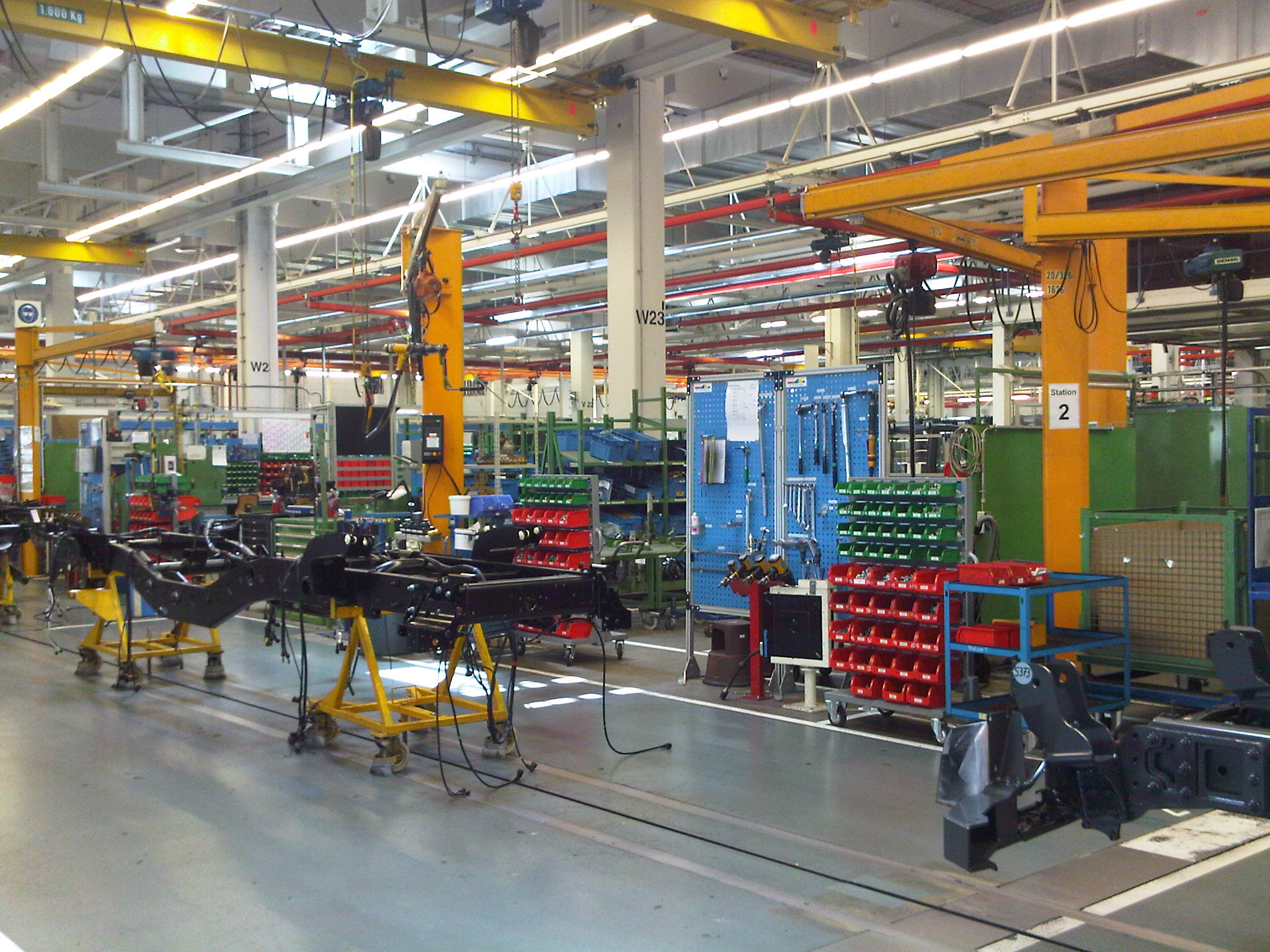
German vehicle factory for Daimler, whose largest consistent shareholder since 1974 has been Kuwait

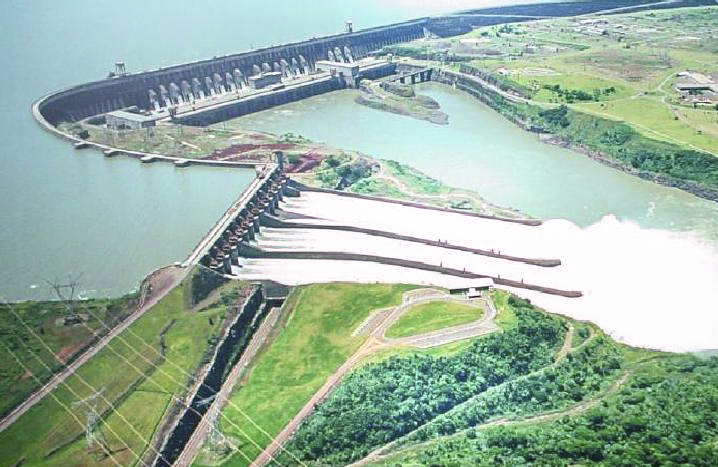
Itaipu Dam between Brazil and Paraguay, financed by loans from petrodollar bank deposits in the 1970s

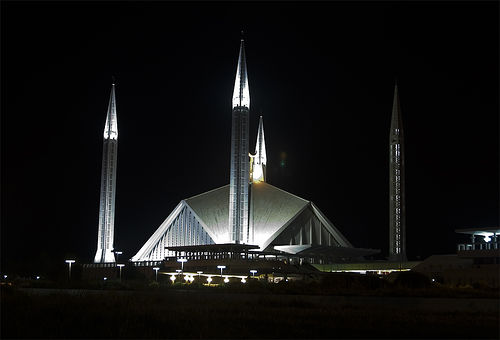
Pakistan's Faisal Mosque, constructed 1976–1986, a gift from Saudi Arabia's King Faisal

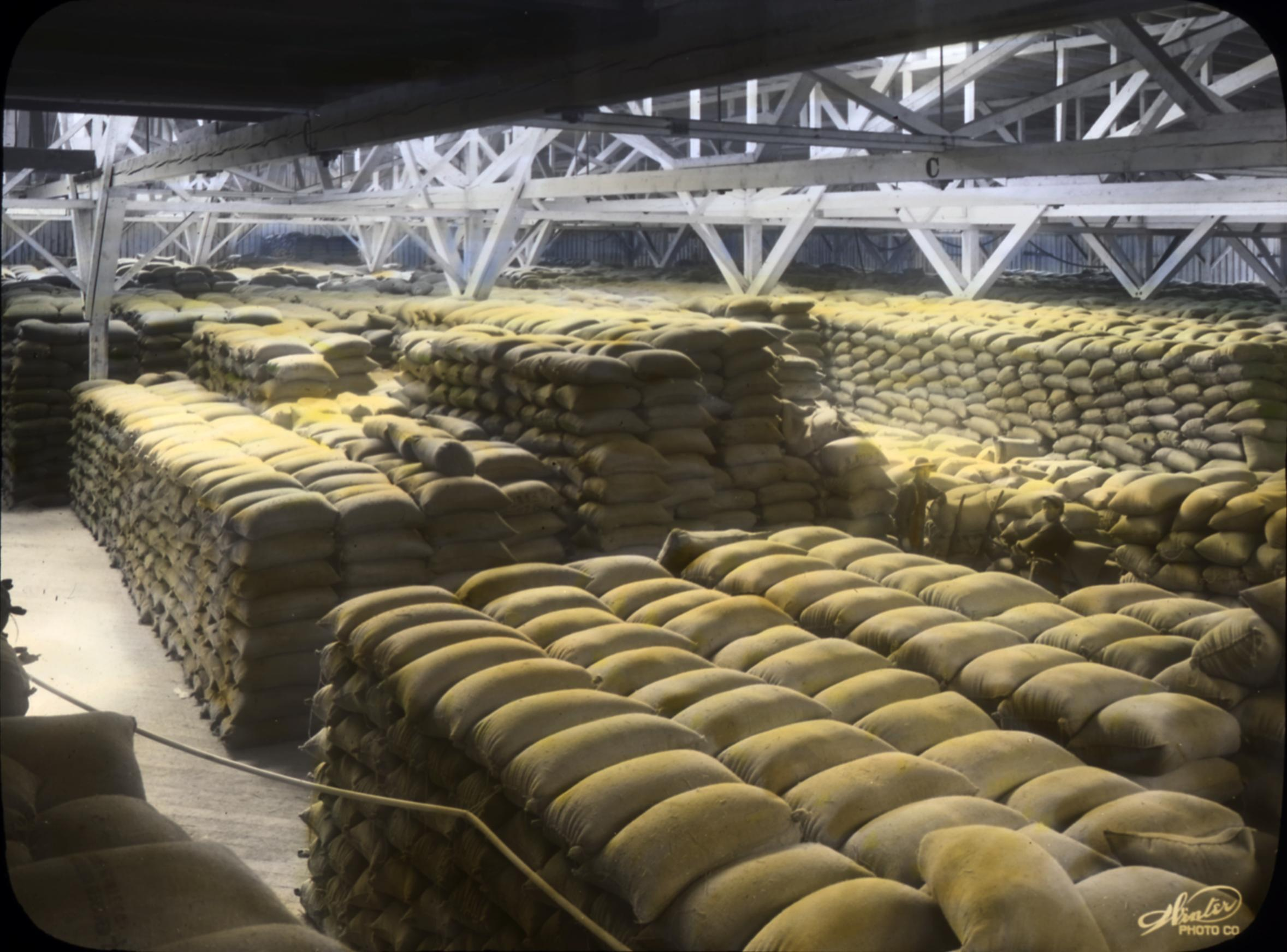
Western grain, heavily imported by the Soviet Union to ease food shortages in the 1970s and 1980s

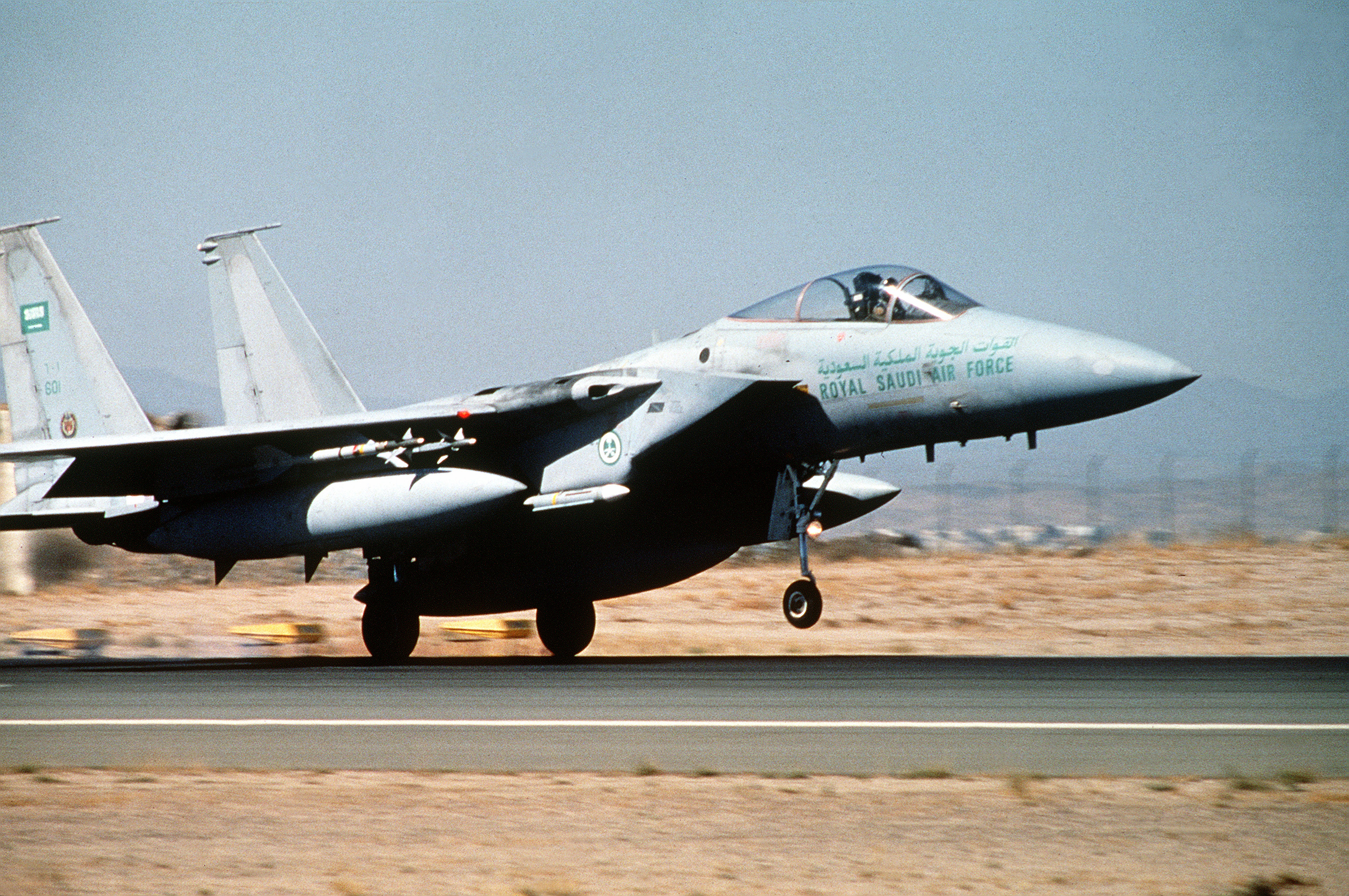
American-built F-15 fighter jet, one of dozens owned by the Royal Saudi Air Force since 1981

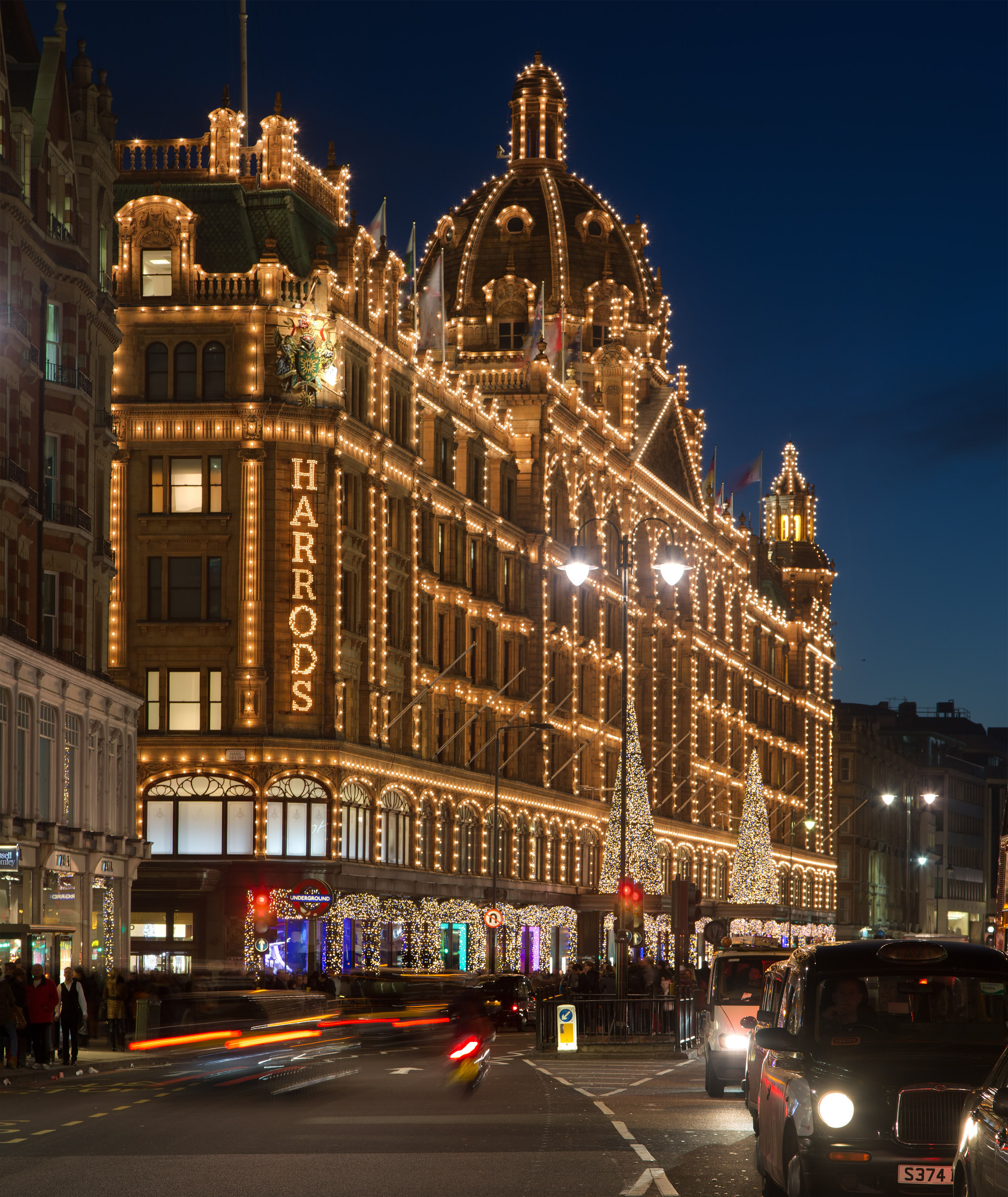
Harrods department store in London, under Arab ownership since 1985

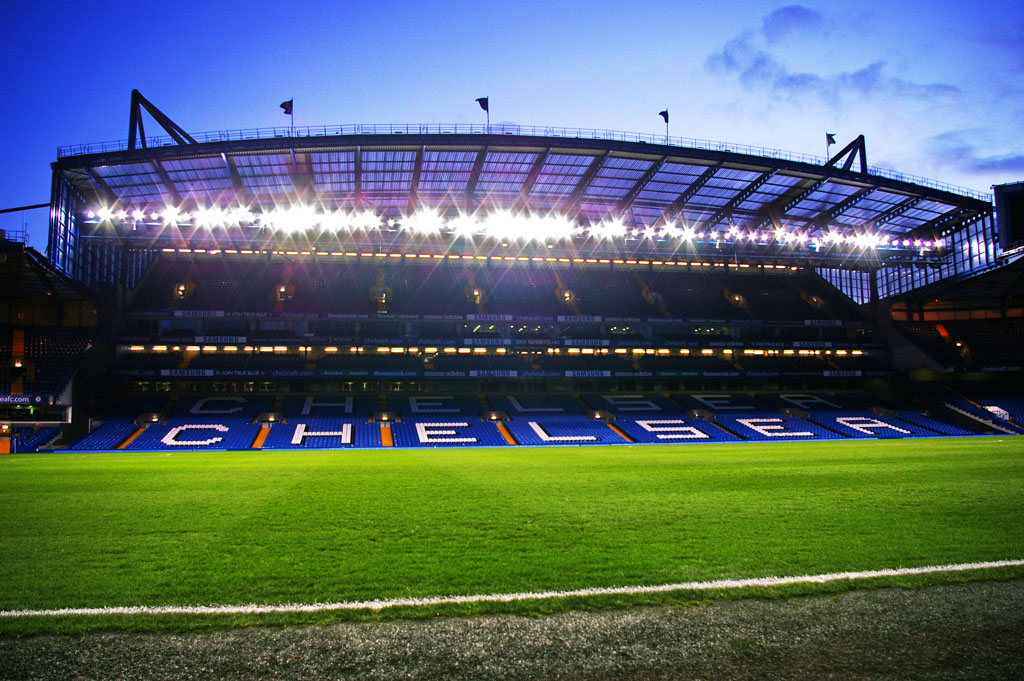
London's Chelsea Football Club, Russian-owned between 2003 and 2022 through the Sibneft oil fortune

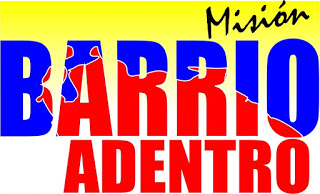
"Oil for doctors" program, with thousands of Cuban physicians anchoring the Venezuelan health system from 2004

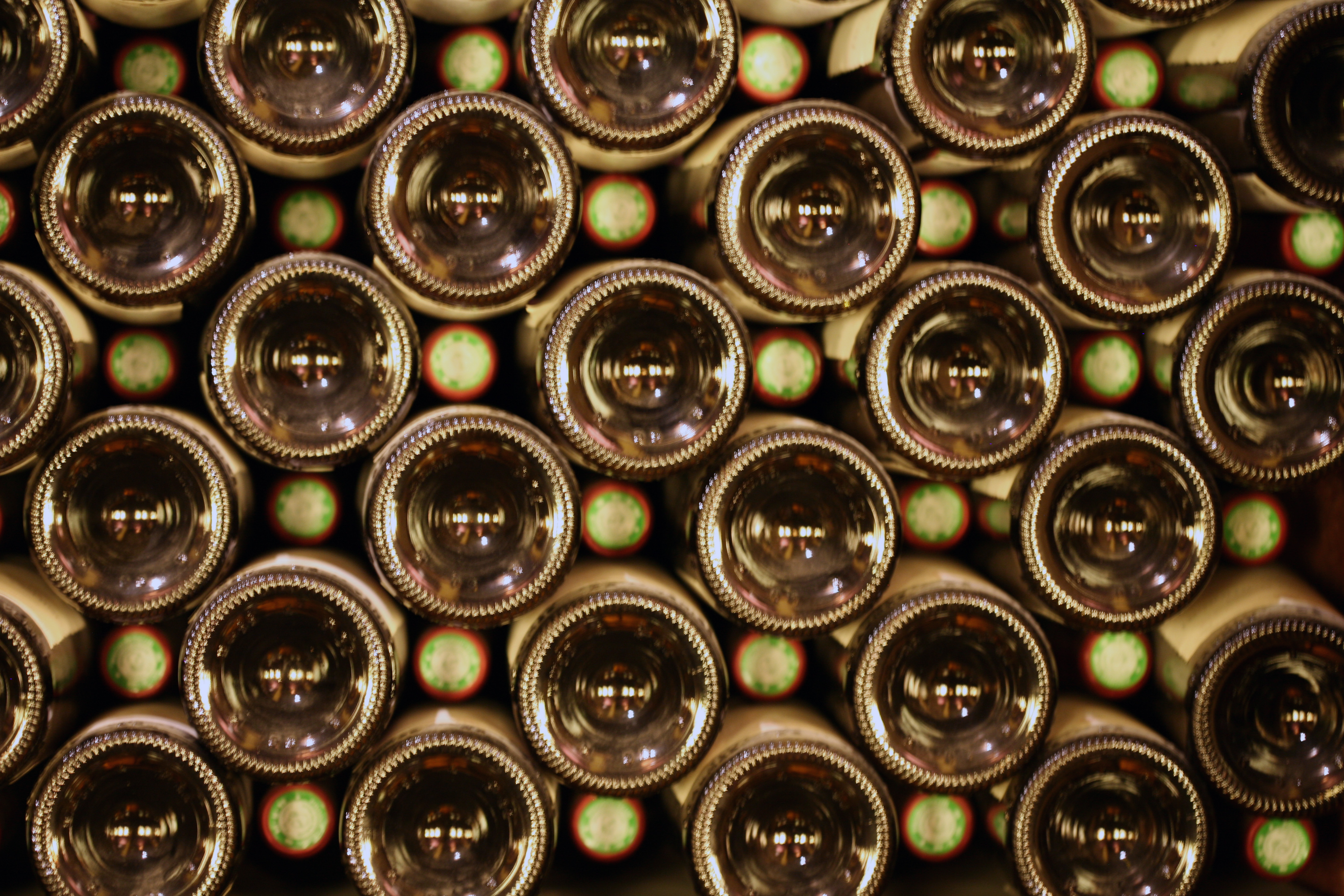
Bottles of premium French wine, millions of which were purchased by the Dubai-owned Emirates airline since 2005

Turkish Telecom Corp., privatised in 2005, Saudi Oger bought 55%, with IMF support

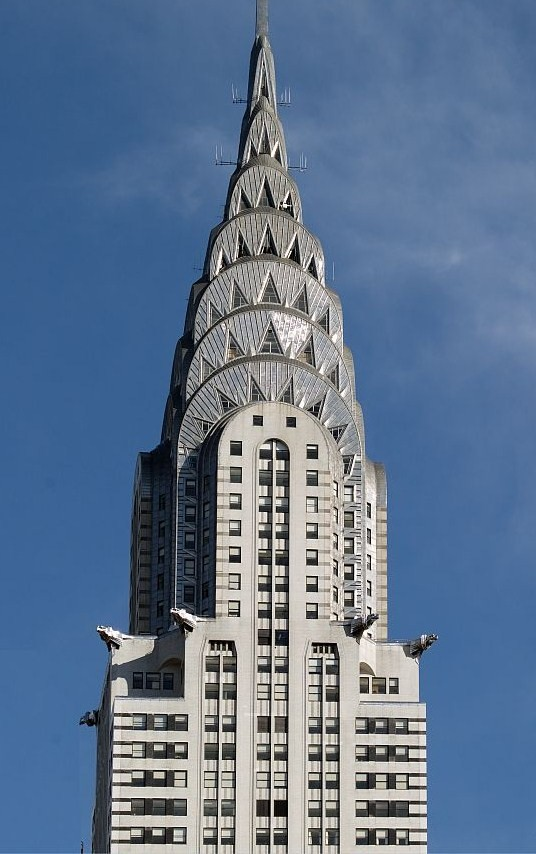
New York's Chrysler Building, 90% owned by the Abu Dhabi Investment Council from 2008 to 2019

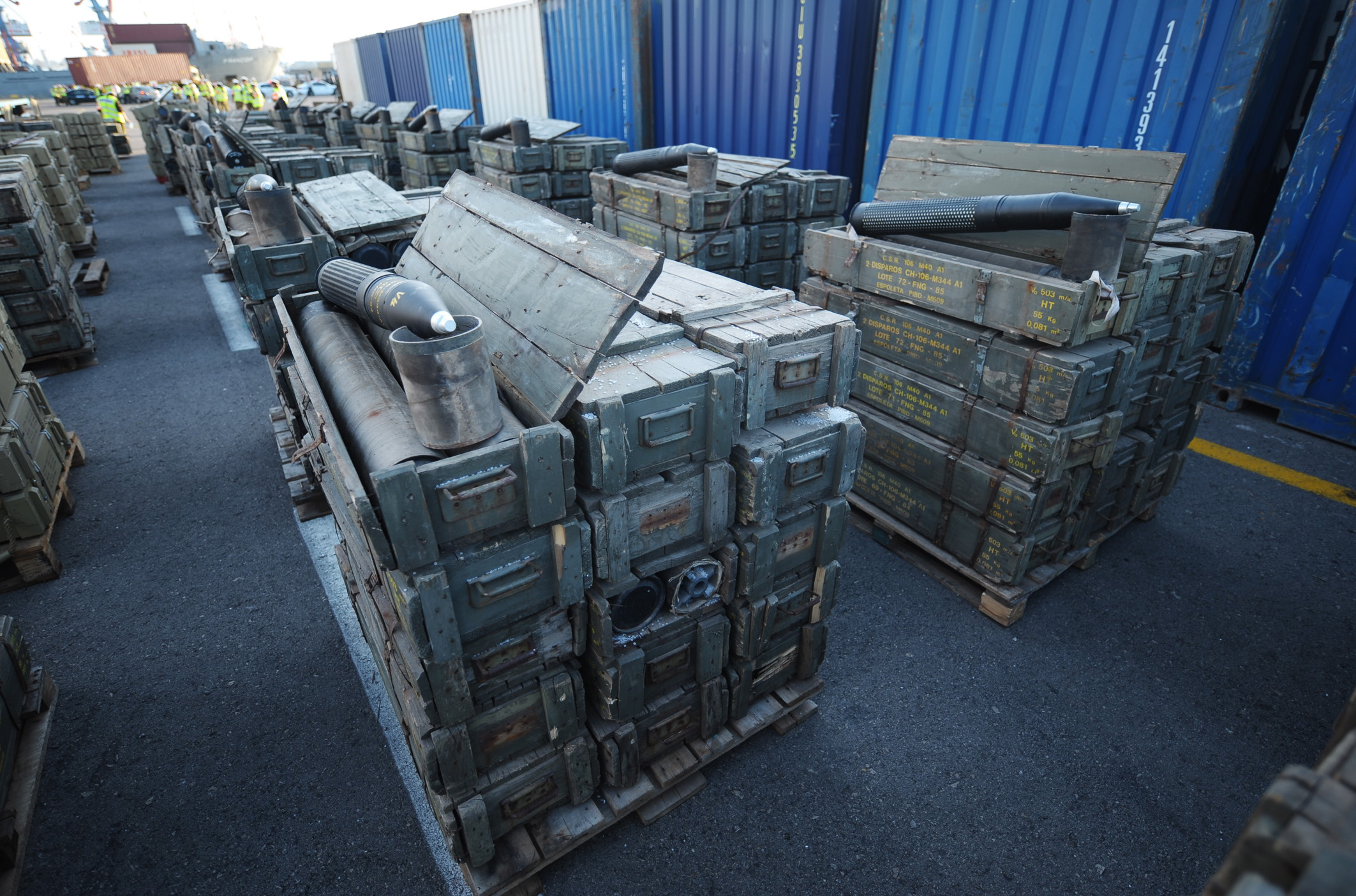
Iranian weapon shipments to Lebanon and Syria, including over 300 tons intercepted in 2009

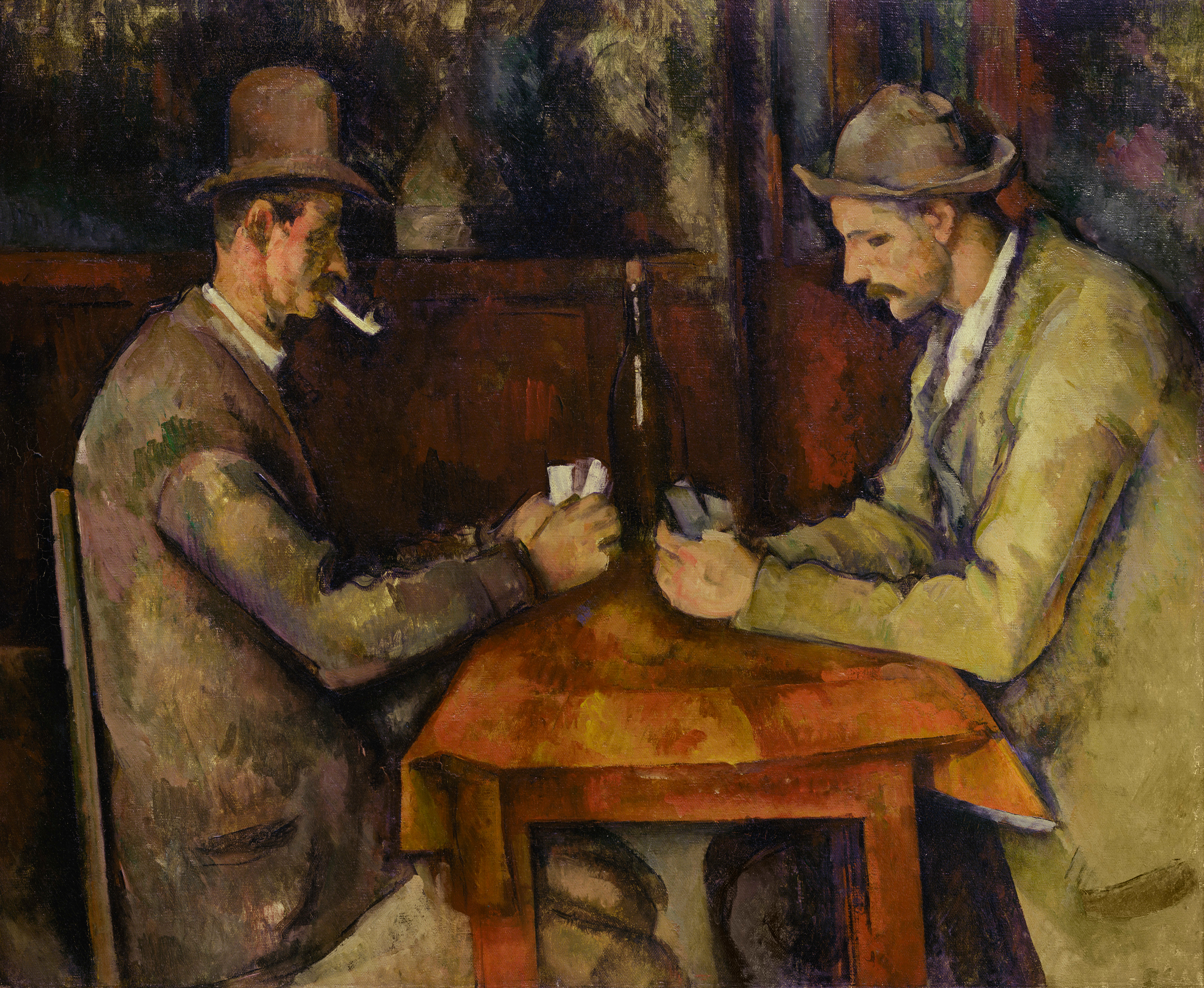
Cézanne painting, purchased in 2011 by the Royal Family of Qatar for a record-setting price above US$250 million

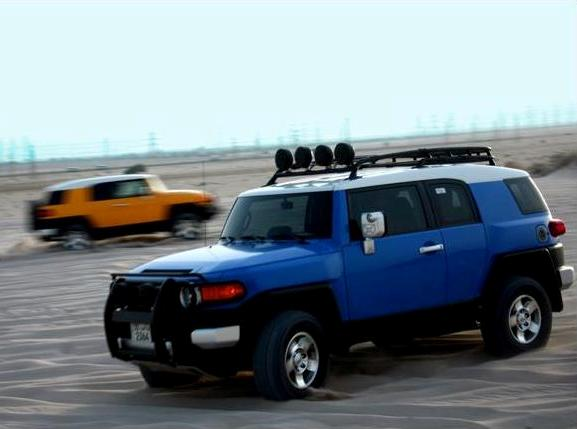
Toyota vehicles in Kuwait, where the Japanese automaker holds a dominant market share

== See also ==
- Dedollarisation
- Saudi Arabia–United States relations
- Petroyuan
