= Madame X =

Madame X or Madam X may refer to:

- Madame X (play), a 1908 stage play by French playwright Alexandre Bisson, with numerous adaptations

== Film ==
- Madame X (1916 film), starring Dorothy Donnelly
- Madame X (1920 film), starring Pauline Frederick
- Madame X (1929 film), starring Ruth Chatterton
- Madame X (1937 film), starring Gladys George
- Madame X (1952 film), starring Gloria Romero
- Madame X (1954 film), a Greek drama film
- Madame X (1955 film), a Mexican drama film
- Madame X (1966 film), starring Lana Turner
- Madame X: An Absolute Ruler, 1978 German fantasy film directed by Ulrike Ottinger
- Madame X (1981 film), starring Tuesday Weld
- Madam X (1994 film), starring Rekha
- Madame X (2000 film), starring Ina Raymundo
- Madame X (2010 film), an Indonesian superhero film
- Madame X (2021 film), a documentary film about Madonna's Madame X Tour

== Music ==
- Madam X (band), an American rock group formed in 1982
- Madame X (album), 2019 release by Madonna
  - Madame X Tour, associated concert tour
    - Madame X: Music from the Theater Xperience, the live album recorded during the tour

== Other uses ==
- Madame X, a character played by Anne Brochet in The Story of Marie and Julien
- Madame X (device), a bombe cryptanalyser used by the US Army during World War II
- Madame Xanadu, a 2012 comic called "Madame X" which featured this character under DC's "National Comics" imprint
- "Madame X", internal code name for the Pontiac Phantom concept car
- Madame X, a nickname of American singer Madonna, given by Martha Graham
- Madame X, a nickname for Agnes Meyer Driscoll, a 20th-century American cryptanalyst.
- Limeslade Mystery, also known as the Madame X Mystery

== See also ==
- Portrait of Madame X, 1884 portrait of Virginie Amélie Avegno Gautreau by John Singer Sargent
- The Strange Madame X, 1951 film
- The Trial of Madame X, 1955 film
- Miss X (disambiguation)
- Lady X (disambiguation)
- Mister X (disambiguation)
