= Alexandre Bisson =

French playwright and novelist (1848–1912)

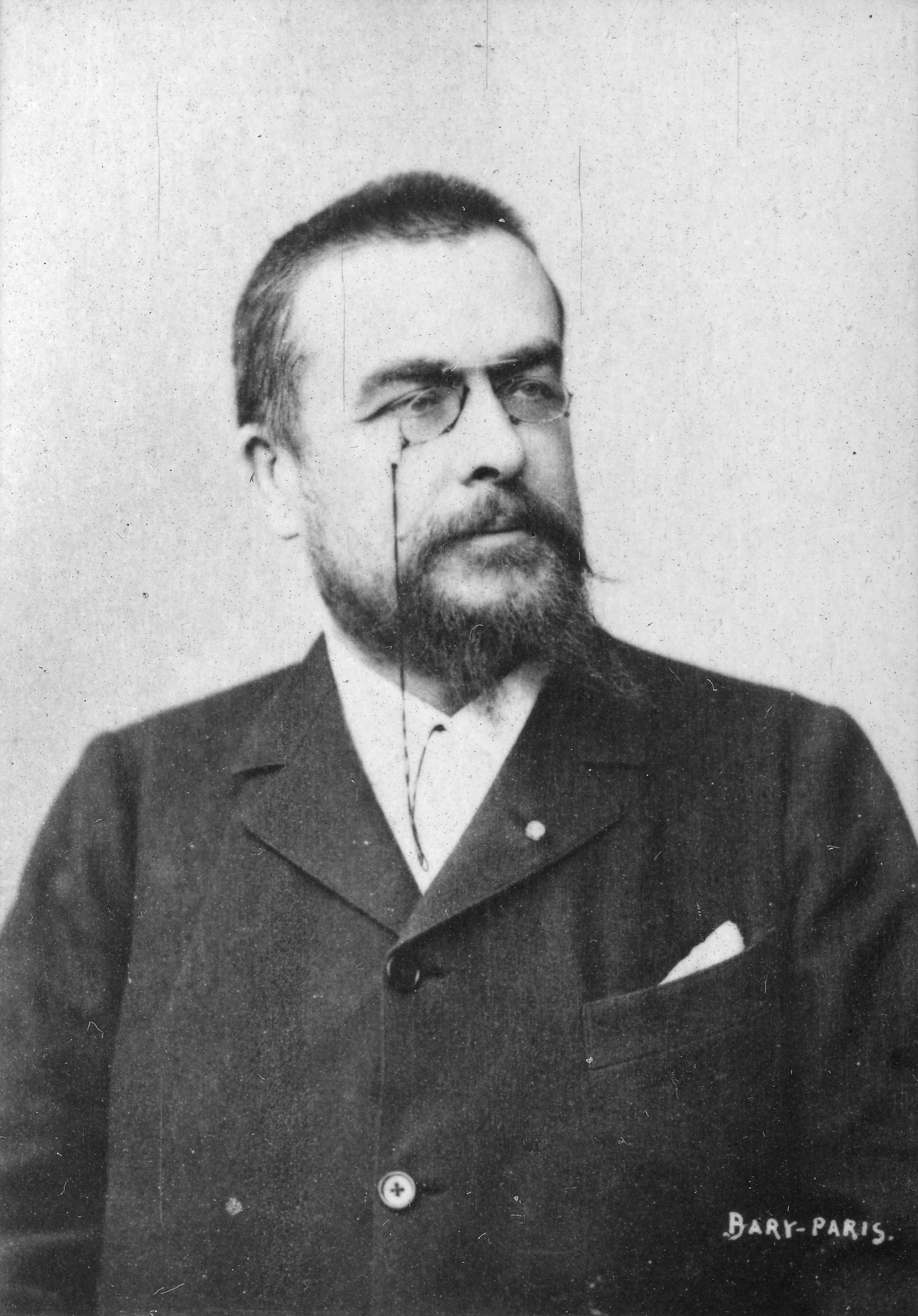
- Bisson c. 1900
- Born: Alexandre Charles Auguste Bisson; 9 April 1848; Briouze
- Died: 27 January 1912 (aged 63); Paris
- Occupations: Playwright, vaudevillist, novelist
- Spouse: Juliette Bisson

Alexandre Bisson (9 April 1848 – 27 January 1912) was a French playwright, vaudeville creator, and novelist. Born in Briouze, Orne in Lower Normandy, he was successful in his native France as well as in the United States. Remembered as a significant creator of Parisian vaudeville, in collaboration with Edmond Gondinet, Bisson's 1881 three-act comedy Un Voyage d'agrément was performed at the Théâtre du Vaudeville in Paris.

Of his works, Bisson is best remembered for his play Madame X, which was performed in 1910 both in Paris and on Broadway with Sarah Bernhardt in the leading role. Over the years, the play would be revived for Broadway three times and nine Madame X motion pictures in several languages have been filmed. The first silent screen adaptation was in 1916 and the latest was in 2000. Better-known versions include a 1929 sound film starring Ruth Chatterton and directed by Lionel Barrymore plus the 1966 film starring Lana Turner. In 2006, a musical based on the original play was produced in Chicago.

Bisson also adapted the 1910 best-selling Florence Barclay novel, The Rosary as a three-act play for the Paris stage. Widely acclaimed in the United States, Bisson was invited to write about the theatre by The Saturday Evening Post and his articles "The Dilemmas of the Theater" and "How the World Contributes to the American Stage" were published in 1912.

Bisson died in Paris in 1912 at the age of 63.

== Selected works for stage ==
- 1882: 115, Rue Pigalle
- 1884: Le Député de Bombignac (Comédie-Française, 28 May 1884)
- 1886: Une Mission délicate
- 1886: Un Conseil judiciaire
- 1887: Ma gouvernante
- 1888: Les Surprises du divorce (with Antony Mars)
- 1893: Le Veglione (le Bal masqué)) (with Albert Carré)
- 1895: Monsieur le Directeur ! (with Fabrice Carré)
- 1896: Disparu !
- 1897: Jalouse
- 1897: La famille Pont-Biquet
- 1898: Feu Toupinel (adapted by William Gillette as Mr. Wilkinson's Widows)
- 1898: Le Contrôleur des wagons-lits
- 1900: Château historique !
- 1901: Le Bon juge
- 1907: Les Plumes du paon
- 1908: Madame X
- 1910: Nick Carter vs. Fantômas (with Guillaume Livet) (translated ISBN 978-1-934543-05-4)

== Filmography ==
=== Madame X adaptations ===
- Hvem er hun?, directed by Holger Rasmussen (Denmark, 1910, short film), starring Oda Nielsen as Jacqueline Floriot
- Madame X, directed by George F. Marion (1916), starring Dorothy Donnelly as Jacqueline Floriot
- A névtelen asszony, directed by Jenő Janovics (Austria-Hungary, 1918), starring Emília Márkus as Jacqueline Fleuriot
- Madame X, directed by Frank Lloyd (1920), starring Pauline Frederick as Jacqueline Fleuriot
- Madame X, directed by Lionel Barrymore (1929), starring Ruth Chatterton as Jacqueline Fleuriot
- La mujer X, directed by Carlos F. Borcosque (Spanish-language, 1931), starring María Fernanda Ladrón de Guevara as Jaquelina
- Madame X, directed by Sam Wood (1937), starring Gladys George as Jacqueline Fleuriot
- Madame X, directed by Artemio B. Tecson (Philippines, 1952), starring Alicia Vergel
- Madame X, directed by Orestis Laskos (Greece, 1954), starring Cybele as Lina Flerianos
- The Trial of Madame X, directed by Paul England (UK, 1955), starring Mary Taviner as Jacqueline
- Madame X, directed by Julián Soler (Mexico, 1955), starring Libertad Lamarque as Adriana
- The Unknown Woman, directed by Mahmoud Zulfikar (Egypt, 1959), starring Shadia
- Madame X, directed by David Lowell Rich (1966), starring Lana Turner as Holly Parker
- Madame X, directed by Robert Ellis Miller (1981, TV film), starring Tuesday Weld as Holly Richardson

=== Other Adaptations ===
- Les Surprises du divorce, directed by Georges Monca (France, 1912, short film, based on the play Les Surprises du divorce)
- Le Contrôleur des wagons-lits, directed by Georges Monca (France, 1913, short film, based on the play Le Contrôleur des wagons-lits)
- Le Bon Juge, directed by Georges Monca (France, 1913, short film, based on the play Le Bon Juge)
- Monsieur le directeur, directed by Georges Monca (France, 1913, short film, based on the play Monsieur le directeur)
- Le Roi Koko, directed by Georges Monca (France, 1913, short film, based on the play Le Roi Koko)
- Her Beloved Villain, directed by Sam Wood (1920, based on the play Le Veglione ou le Bal masqué)
- Un viaggio di piacere, directed by Ermanno Geymonat (Italy, 1922, based on the play Un voyage d'agrément)
- Il controllore dei vagoni letto, directed by Mario Almirante (Italy, 1922, based on the play Le Contrôleur des wagons-lits)
- Le sorprese del divorzio, directed by Guido Brignone (Italy, 1923, based on the play Les Surprises du divorce)
- Château historique, directed by Henri Desfontaines (France, 1924, based on the play Château historique)
- Monsieur le directeur, directed by Robert Saidreau (France, 1925, based on the play Monsieur le directeur)
- Les Surprises du divorce, directed by Jean Kemm (France, 1933, based on the play Les Surprises du divorce)
- Feu Toupinel, directed by Roger Capellani (France, 1934, based on the play Feu Toupinel)
- Der Schlafwagenkontrolleur, directed by Richard Eichberg (Germany, 1935, based on the play Le Contrôleur des wagons-lits)
  - Le Contrôleur des wagons-lits, directed by Richard Eichberg (France, 1935, based on the play Le Contrôleur des wagons-lits)
- La Famille Pont-Biquet, directed by Christian-Jaque (France, 1935, based on the play La Famille Pont-Biquet)
- Min svärmor - dansösen, directed by Thor L. Brooks (Sweden, 1936, based on the play Les Surprises du divorce)
- Êtes-vous jalouse ?, directed by Henri Chomette (France, 1938, based on the play Jalouse)
- Le sorprese del divorzio, directed by Guido Brignone (Italy, 1939, based on the play Les Surprises du divorce)
- Mi fortuna por un nieto, directed by Luis Bayón Herrera (Argentina, 1940)
- Las sorpresas del divorcio, directed by Roberto Ratto (Argentina, 1943, based on the play Les Surprises du divorce)
- Les femmes sont folles, directed by Gilles Grangier (France, 1950, based on the play Château historique)
