= Madame X (1937 film) =

1937 film

- Theatrical release poster
- Directed by: Sam Wood; Gustav Machatý (uncredited)
- Screenplay by: John Meehan
- Based on: La femme X 1908 play by Alexandre Bisson
- Produced by: James Kevin McGuinness
- Starring: Gladys George; Warren William; Reginald Owen
- Cinematography: John F. Seitz
- Edited by: Frank E. Hull
- Music by: David Snell
- Production company: Metro-Goldwyn-Mayer
- Distributed by: Loew's Inc.
- Release date: October 1, 1937
- Running time: 72 minutes
- Country: United States
- Language: English

Madame X is a 1937 American melodrama (or "woman's film"), starring Gladys George and directed by Sam Wood. Previously filmed for American release at least three times (in 1916, 1920, and 1929), the film is based on the 1908 play La femme X by French playwright Alexandre Bisson (1848–1912), translated into English for the American stage in 1910 by John Raphael. Some sources also list Gustav Machaty as an uncredited director, but he was replaced by Wood and it is unclear if any scenes he directed are in the released film. This version of the story includes several significant changes from the original play and earlier films.

== Summary ==
A politically ambitious lawyer discovers that his wife has been having an affair, then throws her out of their home and forbids her to contact their young son. Afraid of arrest for the murder of her lover by another woman, she changes her name and drifts from one city to another until she accidentally reveals her identity to a card sharp who plans to blackmail her husband. When she shoots him to protect her former family, she is arrested for murder and winds up being defended by her now-adult son, who does not know her identity.

== Plot ==
Jacqueline, the wife of lawyer Bernard Fleuriot, is about to break off her affair with a young man, Jean Rochin, when a former lover bursts into his apartment, shoots him, and flees. As police and others respond to the gunshot, Jacqueline escapes unseen. Returning home, she is discovered by her husband, who is angered by her infidelity and her absence while their son had taken ill. Traumatized by these events, Jacqueline pleads for help and forgiveness, but Bernard throws her out of their home, saying that he will tell the son that his mother had died.

Jacqueline assumes a new identity, as a Miss Pran who is governess for two children of a wealthy couple living in Monte Carlo. In the meantime, Bernard, persuaded by his friend Maurice Dourel to find and reconcile with her, learns her location from his housekeeper Rose. Two policemen arrive at the Monte Carlo estate ahead of Bernard, and Jacqueline, afraid that they are investigating her lover's murder, pretends not to be Miss Pran. She then quickly boards the yacht of an American whose advances she had previously rejected and sails with him to New York.

Left on her own in New York, she turns increasingly to drink, working as a hostess/entertainer in bars "in the Old World and the New." In New Orleans, she is hired by a man named Scipio as a hostess and singer, but she flees again, this time to Buenos Aires, where she meets a gambler named Lerocle and helps him to cheat at cards. In a drunken confession one evening, she reveals her real name and former marriage to Lerocle. Seizing this opportunity to blackmail Bernard, Lerocle takes her to Paris, but before he can act on his threat, Jacqueline shoots him rather than let him disgrace her former husband and son.

Now arrested and on trial for murder, Jacqueline refuses to divulge her name to anyone or to defend herself, especially once she realizes that her court-appointed attorney is her now-adult son, Raymond. Bernard, Maurice, and Rose are in the courtroom to support Raymond at his first trial, but Jacqueline signals to them that they should say nothing as Raymond makes a vigorous and emotional appeal to the jury, pleading with them for mercy. Awaiting the verdict, Jacqueline thanks Raymond for his efforts and asks if she can offer "a mother's kiss," then collapses and dies, still without a name for the case.

== Cast ==
- Gladys George as Jacqueline Fleuriot a.k.a. Miss Pran a.k.a. Madame X
- Warren William as Bernard Fleuriot
- John Beal as Raymond Fleuriot
- Reginald Owen as Maurice Dourel
- William Henry as Hugh Fariman, Jr.
- Henry Daniell as Lerocle
- Phillip Reed as Jean Rochin
- Lynne Carver as Helene
- Emma Dunn as Rose, Fleuriot's housekeeper
- Ruth Hussey as Annette
- Luis Alberni as Scipio
- George Zucco as Dr. LaFarge
- Cora Witherspoon as Nora
- Jonathan Hale as Hugh Fariman, Sr.
- Arthur Blake as Ferguson

== Reception ==
Contemporary reviews were generally positive, especially in regard to the performances, though the dated nature of the material was often mentioned. The Ultimate Movie Rankings website lists box office returns for the film at $3.6 million and with positive reception by critics and audiences at 69%.

- A review in Variety was positive, despite the well-worn storyline: "This is a reverent handling of the Alexandre Bisson play, chosen by M-G-M as a vehicle to demonstrate the dramatic and emotional talent of Gladys George. It’s a quiet, comforting sniffle. ...Script follows with devotion the familiar developments, and the dialog is as modern as the action permits. Sam Wood’s direction is conventionally sound and the production is of the best."
- John Kinloch in the California Eagle cites the film as evidence of "the embryonic shift toward melo-drama [sic] in motion picture entertainment." Though he regards this film less favorably than its 1929 predecessor, Kinloch remarks that "'Madame X' proves that Gladys George needs only the proper vehicle to become a First Lady of the Screen."
