= Madame X (1981 film) =

1981 film

- Genre: Drama
- Based on: Madame X 1908 play by Alexandre Bisson
- Written by: Edward Anhalt
- Directed by: Robert Ellis Miller
- Starring: Tuesday Weld; Jeremy Brett; Len Cariou; Eleanor Parker
- Music by: Angela Morley
- Country of origin: United States
- Original language: English

Production
- Producers: Paula Levenback; Wendy Riche
- Cinematography: Woody Omens
- Editor: Skip Lusk
- Running time: 100 minutes
- Production companies: Levenback-Riche Productions; Universal Television

Original release
- Network: NBC
- Release: March 16, 1981

Madame X is a 1981 American made-for-television drama film directed by Robert Ellis Miller and starring Tuesday Weld. It is based on the 1908 play by French playwright Alexandre Bisson (1848–1912).

This film, one among many screen versions of the play, was "penned by Edward Anhalt working from Jean Hollway's '66 screenplay."

The film was first broadcast on NBC on March 16, 1981.

== Plot ==
A woman is thrown out of her home by her mother-in-law and sinks into depravity. Twenty years later, she finds herself accused of murder for saving her daughter (it was her son in all other versions), who does not know who she is.

== Cast ==
- Tuesday Weld as Holly Richardson
- Jeremy Brett as Dr. Terrence Keith
- Len Cariou as John Abbott
- Martina Deignan as Elizabeth Reeves
- Robert Hooks as Dist. Atty. Roerich
- Eleanor Parker as Katherine Richardson
- Jerry Stiller as Burt Orland
- Robin Strand as Willy Dwyer
- Granville Van Dusen as Clay Richardson
- Norman Bartold as Judge Tom Matlock
- Raleigh Bond as Captain Costa
- Stanley Brock as Arthur Penrose
- Camilla Carr as Kit
- Pola Miller as Bejay Matlock
- Tony Plana as Senor Rueda

== See also ==
- List of American films of 1981
- Madame X
