= The Thief (1914 film) =

- Directed by: Edgar Lewis
- Screenplay by: Edgar Lewis
- Based on: The Thief; 1907 play by Henri Bernstein
- Produced by: William Fox
- Starring: Richard Buhler; Edgar L. Davenport; George De Carlton; Dorothy Donnelly
- Production company: Box Office Attractions Company
- Distributed by: Box Office Attractions Company
- Release date: November 19, 1914
- Running time: 5 reels
- Country: United States
- Languages: Silent film (English intertitles)

The Thief is a lost 1914 American silent drama film directed by Edgar Lewis and starring Richard Buhler, Edgar L. Davenport, George De Carlton, and Dorothy Donnelly. It is based on the 1907 play The Thief by Henri Bernstein. The film was released by Box Office Attractions Company on November 19, 1914.

The film was remade as a short film in 1920.

== Cast ==
- Richard Buhler as Richard Voysin
- Edgar L. Davenport as Mr. Legardes
- George De Carlton as Detective
- Dorothy Donnelly as Marie Landau
- Iva Shepard as Mrs. Legardes
- Harry Spingler as Fernand Legardes

== Preservation ==
With no holdings located in archives, The Thief is now considered lost.

== See also ==
- List of lost films
- 1937 Fox vault fire
