= Bill Mitchell (automobile designer) =

American automobile designer (1912–1988)

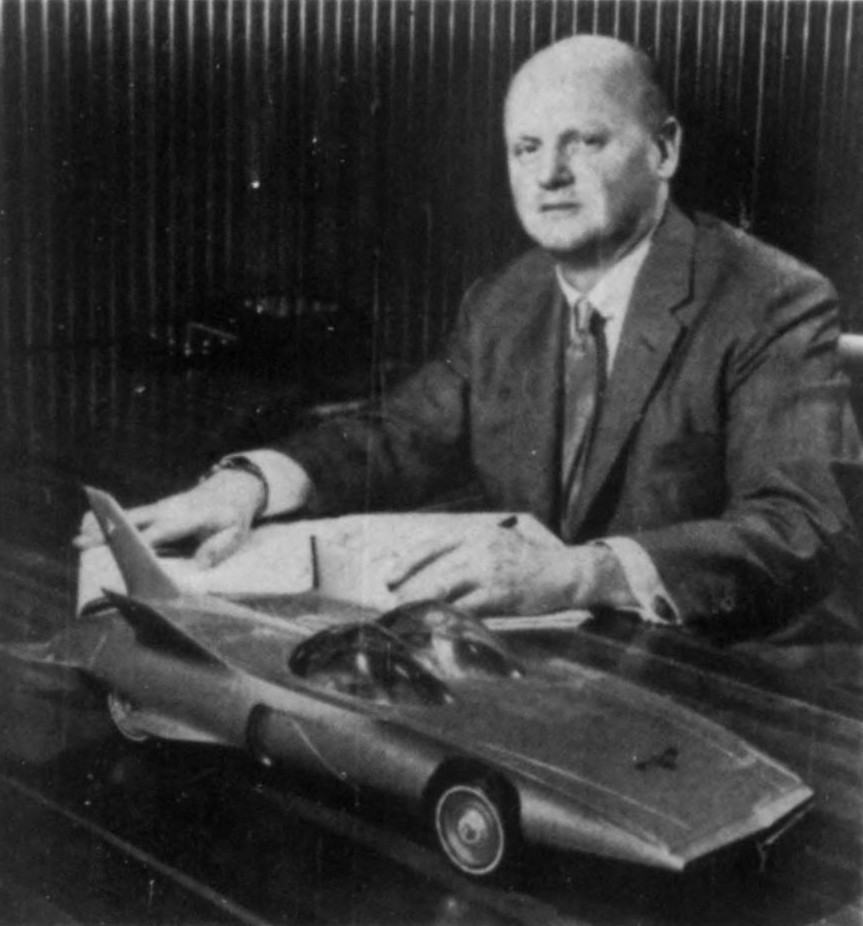
- Mitchell in 1960
- Born: William Leroy Mitchell; July 2, 1912; Cleveland, Ohio, U.S.
- Died: September 12, 1988 (aged 76); Royal Oak, Michigan, U.S.
- Occupations: Automotive designer and executive
- Known for: Head of design at General Motors 1958–1977; innovations in automotive design

William Leroy Mitchell (July 2, 1912 – September 12, 1988) was an American automobile designer. Mitchell worked briefly as an advertising illustrator and as the official illustrator of the Automobile Racing Club of America before being recruited by Harley Earl to join the Art and Color Section of General Motors in 1935.

Mitchell is responsible for creating or influencing the design of over 72.5 million automobiles produced by GM, including such landmark vehicles as the 1938 Cadillac Sixty Special, the 1949 Cadillac Coupe deVille, the 1955–1957 Chevrolet Bel Air, the 1959–1984 Cadillac DeVille, the 1963–1965 and 1966–1967 Buick Riviera, the 1961–1976 Corvette Stingray, the 1970–1981 Chevrolet Camaro, the 1976–1979 Cadillac Seville, and the 1980–1985 Cadillac Seville.

Mitchell spent the entirety of his 42-year career in automobile design at General Motors, eventually becoming Vice President of Design, a position he held for 19 years until his retirement in 1977. His design stewardship at General Motors became known as the 'Bill Mitchell era'.

== Early life and education ==
Bill Mitchell was the son of a Buick dealer and developed a talent for sketching automobiles at an early age. He grew up in Greenville, Pennsylvania and New York City. Mitchell attended the Carnegie Institute of Technology in Pittsburgh, Pennsylvania and later studied at the Art Students' League in New York, New York.

== At Barron Collier Advertising ==
After completing art school, Mitchell joined the New York City based Barron Collier Advertising where he prepared layouts and advertising illustrations, including U.S. advertisements for MG cars. While working at the agency, Mitchell met brothers Barron Collier Jr., Miles Collier and Sam Collier, who had founded the Automobile Racing Club of America (ARCA) (a forerunner of the Sports Car Club of America) in 1931. Mitchell became the official illustrator of the club and his sketches for the club eventually came to the attention of Harley Earl, then head of General Motors Art and Color Section.

== At General Motors Corporation ==
=== Art and Color Section ===
Based on sketches Mitchell created as the official illustrator for the ARCA, Harley Earl recruited Mitchell to General Motors' then new Art and Color Section on December 15, 1935.

=== Chief Designer, Cadillac ===
In 1936 Earl appointed Mitchell as the Chief Designer in the then newly created Cadillac design studio.

=== Director of Styling (under the Vice President of styling section) ===
On May 1, 1954 Mitchell became General Motors Director of Styling under Harley Earl.

=== Vice President, Styling Section (in charge of all styling at GM) ===
In December 1958, Harley Earl reached GM's mandatory retirement age of 65 and thus retired from his position as chief stylist. The 46-year-old Mitchell succeeded him as General Motors Vice President, Styling Section. Mitchell set out to break with the styling cues used under Harley Earl, wanting to eliminate chrome excess, fat fins and similar signature marks.

==== 1960s ====
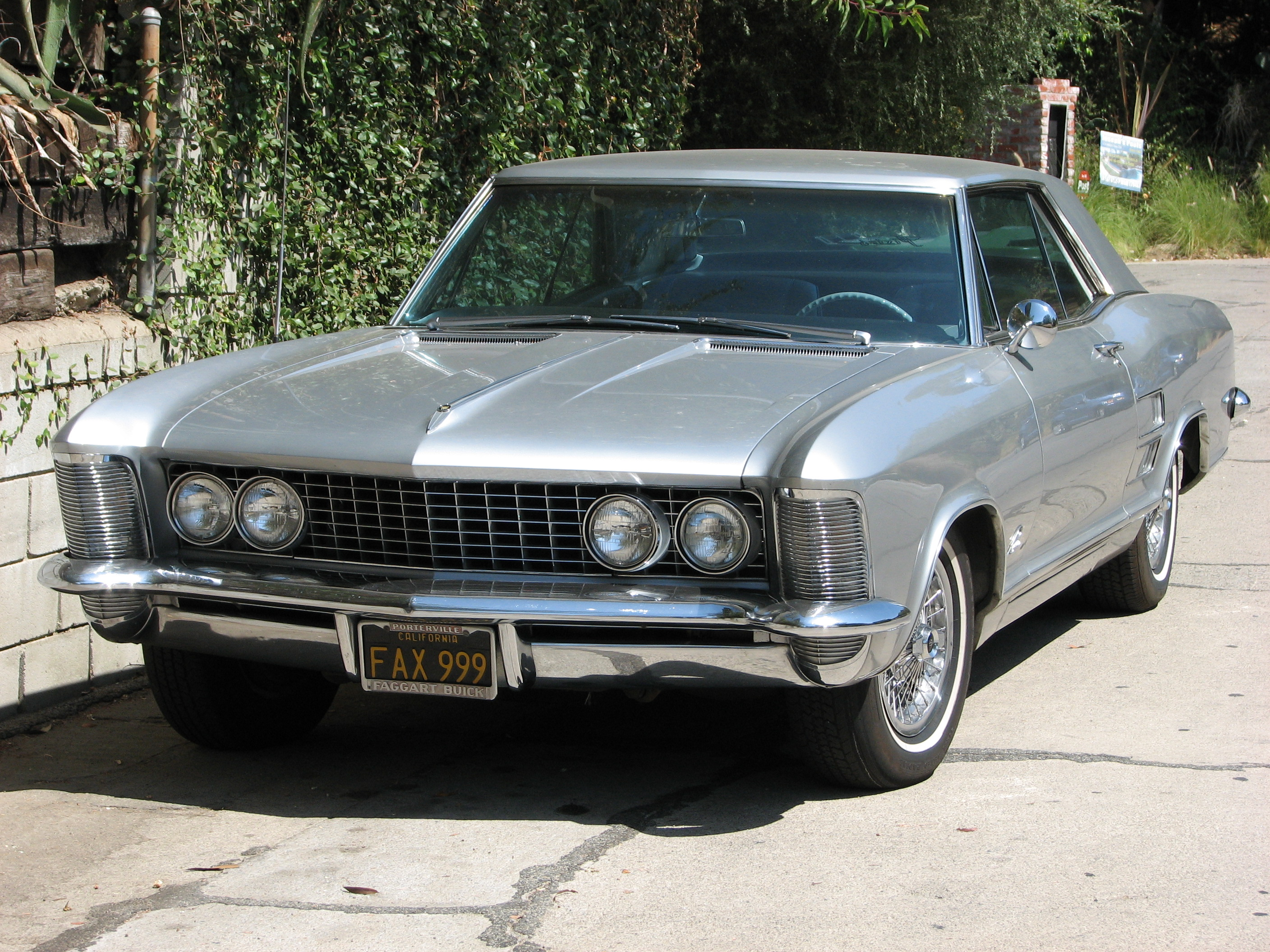
The 1963 Buick Riviera was one of Mitchell's famous designs during his tenure as Chief of styling at GM.

In the 60s, Mitchell promoted what he called the "sheer look," a more aerodynamic, "shoulderless" drop off from a car's windows to its sides.

Mitchell gave GM designers the assignment of combining Rolls-Royce and Ferrari styling cues to create Buick's classic 1963 Riviera. According to a popular story, Mitchell got the idea for the Riviera in Paris. He had originally envisaged the design for Cadillac Division, as a new La Salle, "a baby Cadillac". The Riviera also featured frameless glass in the front doors, giving hardtops an even sleeker look.

An encounter with a shark, while skin diving in the Bahamas, inspired Mitchell's Corvette Shark show car, his Stingray racer and the production 1963 Corvette Stingray, largely designed by Larry Shinoda, under Mitchell's direction. The designs for both the 1963 Corvette and the 1963 Riviera were accepted by their respective divisions on Christmas Eve 1961, in what Mitchell referred to as perhaps the greatest moment of his life.

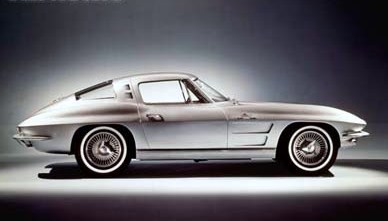
The 1963 Corvette Sting Ray Coupe featured what is sometimes referred to as "Coke bottle" styling.

Mitchell's fondness for split rear windows as featured on the 1957 Buick and on the 1963 Corvette Stingray coupe was not shared by some of his fellow stylists or the buying public and both cars dropped the feature after a measure of public resistance. The split rear window would be eliminated (and re-worked into one pane of curved glass) for the 1964 Corvette coupe. The 1963-1967 Stingray (in both coupe and roadster editions), with its slightly bulged front and rear quarter-panels, would be one of the first General Motors cars to feature what came to be known as "Coke bottle" styling, creating an aggressive and muscular look.

Mitchell also influenced the dramatic styling of the second generation 1965 rear-engine Corvair, which, like other GM models introduced for that year, used curved side-window glass to enhance its "Coke Bottle" profile.

==== 1970s ====
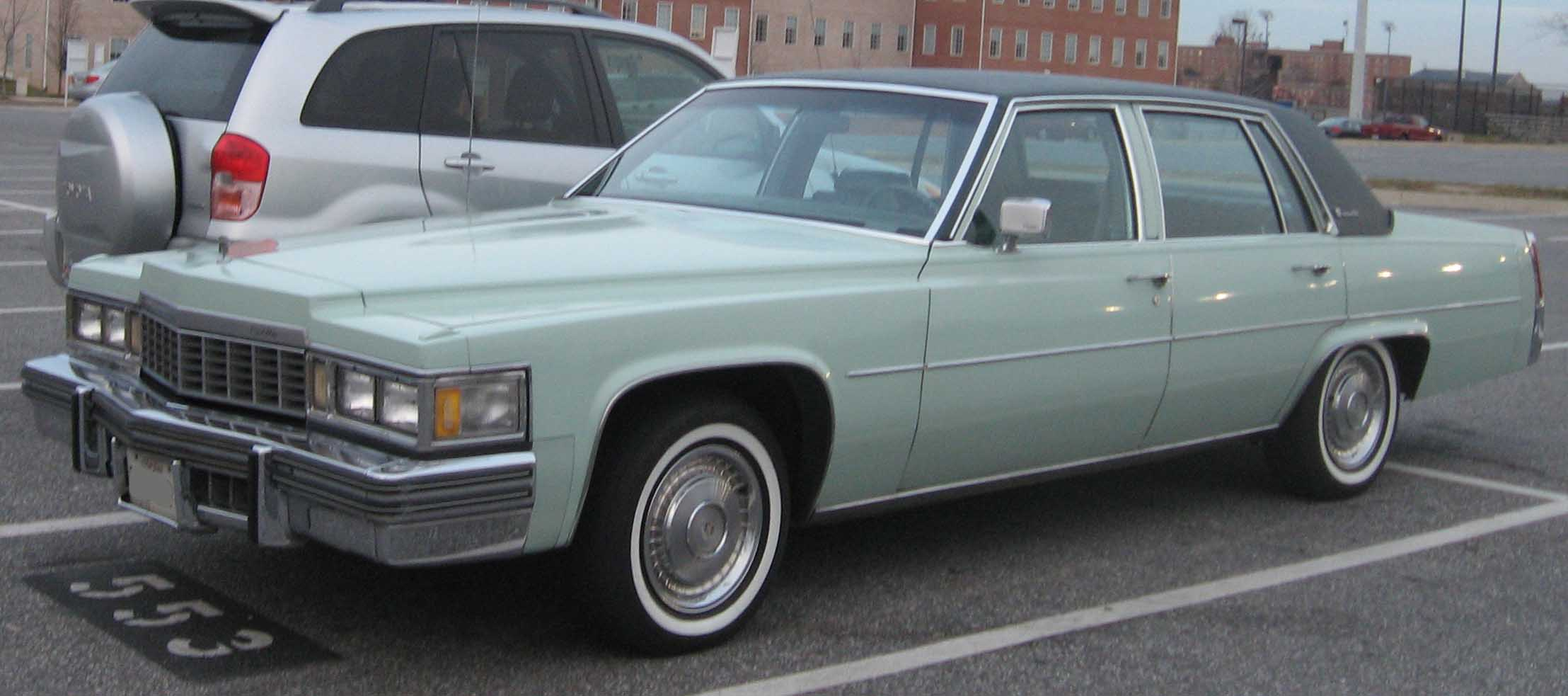
The 1977 Cadillac Sedan deVille featured slightly downsized styling influenced by the 1976 Cadillac Seville

During the 1973–74 energy crisis, which brought on a greater demand for smaller cars in place of the larger cars that had been GM's bread and butter profit machine for decades, Mitchell oversaw the styling and design efforts of GM's downsized full-sized and intermediate-sized cars which were introduced in the late 1970s, some of the last designs that he would lead—and all largely based on themes first developed in his 1976 Cadillac Seville. Mitchell designed the popular 1977 Chevrolet Caprice. However, when it came to compact and subcompact cars, Mitchell, who often struggled with alcoholism, reflected that "Small cars are like vodka. Sure people will try them out but they won't stay with them."

Mitchell stepped down as chief stylist in July 1977 following his 65th birthday. The last car he designed at GM was the 1977 Pontiac Phantom concept, which now resides at the Sloan Museum. He was also instrumental in the design of what would become the 1980–1985 Cadillac Seville. On August 1, 1977, Irv Rybicki succeeded Mitchell as Vice President of General Motors Design.

==== 1980s ====
Following his retirement from General Motors, Mitchell ran William L. Mitchell Design, a private design-consulting firm, from 1977 to 1984. He was a vocal critic of the new fourth-generation Corvette's styling, which he referred to as "bland." Bill Mitchell died at the age of 76 from heart failure at William Beaumont Hospital in Royal Oak, Michigan, on September 12, 1988.

== Awards and recognition ==
Bill Mitchell was inducted into the Corvette Hall of Fame by the National Corvette Museum in 1998.
