= Hamilton Keene =

British actor (1896–1975)

- Born: 15 November 1896; Hampstead, London, UK
- Died: 4 October 1975 (aged 78); Chelsea, London, UK
- Occupation: Actor
- Years active: 1929–1955 (film)

Hamilton George Keene (15 November 1896 – 4 October 1975) was a British stage and film actor. He appeared in more than thirty British films, originally in more prominent roles during the early 1930s and later in smaller, often uncredited parts. They included: The Mutiny of the Elsinore (1937), It's Not Cricket (1949), Burnt Evidence (1964) and nearly thirty others.

== Selected filmography ==
- Lost Patrol (1929)
- The Middle Watch (1930)
- Suspense (1930)
- The New Hotel (1932)
- Illegal (1932)
- Leave It to Blanche (1934)
- The Blue Squadron (1934)
- The Office Wife (1934)
- Little Stranger (1934)
- The Mutiny of the Elsinore (1937)
- Mountains O'Mourne (1938)
- The Body Vanished (1939)
- The Briggs Family (1940)
- Contraband (1940)
- I'll Turn to You (1946)
- It's Not Cricket (1949)
- The Second Mate (1950)
- Night and the City (1950)
- Tread Softly (1952)
- Innocents in Paris (1953)
- The Devil's Jest (1954)
- Burnt Evidence (1954)
- Forbidden Cargo (1954)
- The Trial of Madame X (1955)

== Bibliography ==
- Paul M. Edwards. World War I on Film: English Language Releases through 2014. McFarland, 2016.
