= Madame X (1929 film) =

1929 film

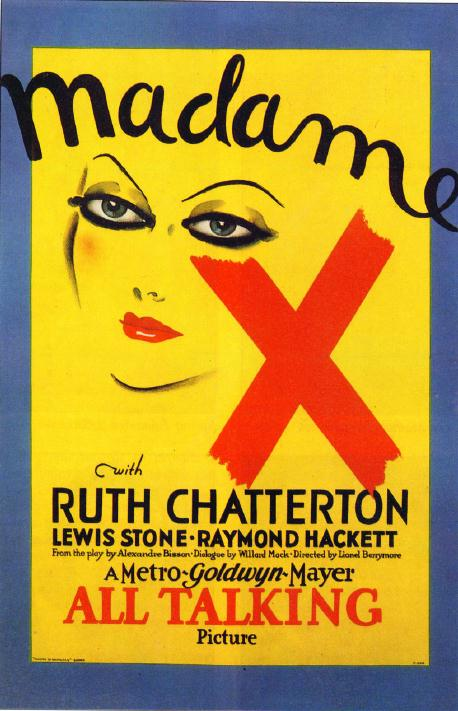
- Film poster
- Directed by: Lionel Barrymore
- Written by: Alexandre Bisson (play); Willard Mack
- Based on: Madame X 1908 play by Alexandre Bisson
- Starring: Ruth Chatterton; Lewis Stone
- Cinematography: Arthur Reed
- Edited by: William S. Gray
- Music by: William Axt
- Distributed by: Metro-Goldwyn-Mayer
- Release date: August 17, 1929
- Running time: 95 minutes
- Country: United States
- Language: English

Madame X is a 1929 American pre-Code drama film directed by Lionel Barrymore and starring Ruth Chatterton as a fallen woman who longs to be reunited with her son. The film is based on the 1908 play Madame X by French playwright Alexandre Bisson (1848–1912).

Harold Bucquet was Barrymore's assistant director.

As a film published in 1929, it entered the public domain on January 1, 2025.

== Plot ==
Jacqueline Floriot is thrown into the street without any money by her jealous husband Louis when he discovers that she had been involved in an affair. She is not permitted to see their four-year-old son, and she soon sinks into depravity.

Twenty years later, she has become the mistress of Laroque, a cardsharp. When he discovers that her husband is now the attorney general, Laroque tries to blackmail him. Desperate to shield her son from her disgrace, she shoots and kills her lover.

By chance, the lawyer assigned to her case is her own son. He is puzzled and frustrated when she refuses to defend herself in court. During the trial, her husband testifies in support of his son. When she sees that he recognizes her and is about to speak, she makes an impassioned plea for understanding of her motive. As she had intended, the hidden message silences Louis. When Jacqueline faints from the strain, she is carried into a private chamber. There, she kisses her son, who is still unaware that she is his mother, and dies.

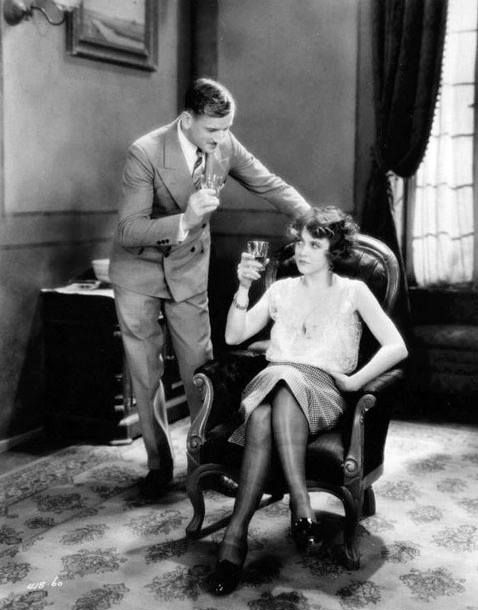
Ullrich Haupt and Ruth Chatterton in Madame X

== Cast ==
- Ruth Chatterton as Jacqueline Floriot
- Lewis Stone as Louis Floriot
- Raymond Hackett as Raymond Floriot
- Holmes Herbert as Noel
- Eugenie Besserer as Rose, the Floriots' servant
- Mitchell Lewis as Colonel Hanby
- Ullrich Haupt as Laroque
- Sidney Toler as Dr. Merivel
- Richard Carle as Perissard
- Claude King as Valmorin, the prosecutor

== Production ==
The story had been filmed in 1920 by Goldwyn Pictures with Pauline Frederick in the lead role. When Goldwyn merged with two other film studios to become MGM in 1924, the studio inherited the screen rights to the story.

No music is heard under the opening or closing credits of Madame X, as studios at the time expected local theater musicians to provide live accompaniment to the credits. Because keyboardists and orchestras were still working in the theaters in the late 1920s providing music for silent films still in distribution, live music was seen as a way to make the screening more of a special event and not a purely canned presentation.

Barrymore consciously avoided the song-and-dance formula that dominated early sound pictures, treating Madame X as a dramatic play. To emphasize the film's credentials as a serious drama and avoid any music-hall associations, MGM premiered the film in New York City's Sam H. Harris Theater, a legitimate stage venue that was rented for the occasion.

== Reception ==
Critics praised the film as "the most intelligent, original, and absorbing talking picture yet made," with Ruth Chatterton getting special commendation. The film was considered for Academy Awards for Best Director (Barrymore) and Best Actress (Chatterton). However, these were not official nominations because the practice of nominating finalists for the awards had not yet been adopted.

The film was also noted for addressing the topic of alcoholism, namely the addiction to absinthe that contributes to the ruin of Jacqueline's life.

== See also ==
- List of early sound feature films (1926–1929)
- Madame X disambiguation page
