= Mary Taviner =

British actress and fascist (1909–1972)

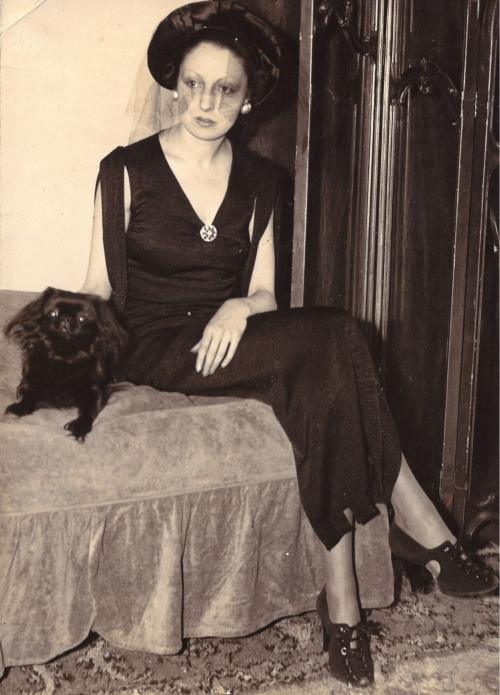
- Mary Taviner c. 1939 (from the archive of the British Library, Add MS 89481/10, f. 50)
- Born: Mary Russell Taviner; 28 November 1909; Turnham Green, London
- Died: 21 September 1972 (aged 62); St Pancras, London
- Other names: Mara Russell-Tavernan; Mara Tavernan; Mary Tavernan; Myra Tavernan; Mary Russell-Tavernan; Mara Russell Tavernan; Mary Russell Tavernan; Mary Russell Taviner; Mary Russell Tavinor; Mara Tavanan; Mary Tavener; Mary Russell Tavener; Mary Taverner; Mara Tavana; Baroness Marovna; Mary Marovna; Mrs Alexis Marovonoff

Mary Taviner (also known as Mara Russell-Tavernan and by several other names; 28 November 1909 – 21 September 1972), was a British stage and film actress active during the early- and mid-20th century, known for her roles in British second feature ('B') drama and mystery films. She was also an active member of the far-right from the pre-Second World War days of British fascism and continuing into the late 1960s. She had an affair with Sir Oswald Mosley, founder of the British Union of Fascists, sued him for slander, and British Intelligence concluded she was blackmailing him.

== Biography ==
=== Early life ===
Mary Russell Taviner was born on 28 November 1909 in Turnham Green, London. Her parents were Mabel Caroline Griffiths and Horace Russell Taviner, who had a florist business in Hammersmith. They later divorced.

=== Stage and film career ===
As a child, Mary appeared as a ballerina in educational short films, and in a drama film Darby and Joan (1920). Picturegoer described her as a "British child talent" and her interpretation "stands out as a performance". Kine Weekly later commented that she "started her career as one of England's leading child film stars." She also made 115 appearances on stage in 1924–1925, taking part in "pretty and charming" dances as a fairy in A Midsummer Night's Dream at The Old Vic and at the Theatre Royal, Drury Lane.

The reception of her acting career after childhood is mixed; her stage performances portraying Mary, Queen of Scots were described as played "with reserve and dignity" (Royal Scapegoat, 1939) and giving "a most memorable performance ... dignified, restrained, and deeply moving" (Mary Stuart, 1940). Her adult film career consisted of three films: Castle Sinister (1948); The Trial of Madame X (filmed in 1948, released 1955; she had previously appeared in stage versions of the play in 1944), for which Kine Weekly commented that she "displays all the confidence but unfortunately little of the talent of Sarah Bernhardt, [and] bites off more than she can chew as Jacqueline"; and The Devil's Jest (1954), in which Kine Weekly noted she "keeps forgetting her accent and exaggerates."

=== Claims of royal or noble associations ===
Taviner claimed she could trace her lineage back to the House of Guise, and separately that she was descended from a German prince and an English or Irish aristocrat; there is no evidence for either assertion. She also claimed she had had an unconsummated marriage in France, resulting in her having the title of Baroness Marovna. She was later described as the "widow of a young Russian nobleman who claimed descent from the Romanoffs – the royal family of Imperial Russia."

Taviner also claimed she had been elected in 1939 as spiritual leader of Scotland by a group of Scottish nationalists, and that she was the reincarnation of Mary, Queen of Scots. This claim was based on a supposed resemblance; on Taviner saying she "had always felt drawn to the queen"; and on the testimony of a "famous Highland seeress". She had a portrait painted of her dressed as Mary, Queen of Scots, played the queen on stage, and often portrayed monarchs and aristocrats on stage and in film.

=== Fascism and Oswald Mosley ===
In June 1933, Taviner met the newly widowed Sir Oswald Mosley, founder and leader of the British Union of Fascists at a film studio (she was visiting as a potential producer and he with a view to making a film about fascism), and they had an affair. Taviner declared she wanted to marry him, and wrote him lengthy, rambling and spiteful letters. Several months later Taviner wrote him a very long letter, referring to a discussion of marriage between them, and claiming royal descent for herself. After this, Mosley would not return her phone calls and may have given orders that she should not be allowed into his house. Rumours spread of compromising letters, which might have had serious political consequences for Mosley and the BUF.

She enlisted the help of William Joyce (later known as Lord Haw-Haw), who had been sacked from the BUF by Mosley in 1937 and had set up the rival National Socialist League and was seeking revenge. He wrote that Mosley was guilty of breach of promise to Taviner, had cast aspersions about her, and had freely shown off a compromising photograph of her. In July 1937, Taviner was observed visiting the NSL's headquarters, and British Intelligence concluded she was blackmailing Mosley. In February 1938, Taviner, described as "a noted society beauty, [who] has appeared on the stage and in several films", launched a lawsuit for slander against Mosley on the grounds of breach of promise and displaying a 'lightly veiled' or nude photograph of herself, which was missing. She represented herself in court, and the case was eventually dismissed, She later accused Joyce of running a 300-strong pre-war spy ring under the noses of the intelligence services, an unlikely claim. Joyce rebutted this charge on air. In 1949 she was declared bankrupt (giving her profession as film producer), and she did not apply for discharge until 1957.

After the war, Taviner remained in contact with Mosley, and was involved with post-war far-right political parties, including Mosley's Union Movement, and was treasurer of the White Defence League. Mosley used her as an intermediary in discussions with rival far-right factions. She was also the chief organiser of the Young Britain Movement, organising secretary for the fascist Friends of Europe group, and stood unsuccessfully as a UM candidate in the 1962 Kensington borough council election.

The Devil's Jest (1954) was the first and only film produced by Taviner's own company, Terra Nova Productions, and gives an insight into her post-war political views. The film starts with a voiceover, which says:

In the year 1939, those who plan wars, that they might fatten upon the fruits of wars, once again loosed the Four Horsemen of the Apocalypse across the western world. And when this story begins, two great nations were locked in deadly combat. Whilst, to the east, the red vultures waited to feast upon the carcasses of victor and vanquished alike.

A monologue by her character in the film says that Britain and Germany should have been allies against communism during the Second World War, rather than fighting each other:

It is a shame that England allied itself with half the decadent countries of Europe and was used as a tool by the communist conspiracy to enslave the world to communism through a path of filth and degeneration. I believe that England will rue the day that she opposes the German plan for a new order in Europe, and that the day will come when we Englishmen will be glad when, shoulder to shoulder with the Germans, we face our own destruction, we preserve and tame the monster we so blindly helped create.

The Sunday Express reported Taviner as saying at the time, "I have Fascist sympathies, but the film is not pro-German. I love Germany because I had a German grandmother", an untrue statement. A contemporaneous interview in Der Spiegel observed that a "bracelet with the Iron Cross clinked softly on her wrist." In the same interview, she claimed that during the war, she worked in the British Intelligence Service, uncovering communist activities, a claim which is almost certainly fictional.

=== Death ===
Taviner died from a heart attack on 21 September 1972 in St Pancras, London. She lived with her mother for her entire adult life, and there is no evidence that she married or had children. Her death went almost unnoticed, and was not reported even in The Stage, the theatre's leading newspaper.

== Stage appearances ==
Partial list:

- 1924–1925: A Midsummer Night's Dream by William Shakespeare; The Old Vic and Theatre Royal, Drury Lane
- 1939: Royal Scapegoat by Jean Erskine; Twentieth Century Theatre, Westbourne Grove
- 1940: Mary Stuart by John Drinkwater; Lindsey Theatre Club, Palace Gardens Terrace
- 1940: Snow White and the Seven Dwarfs; Aberdyfi
- 1942: The Mark of Judas by Vance Youdan; (Note: Vance Youdan, Youden or Uhden may have been related to Taviner, whose maternal grandmother's surname was Youdan.) Scala Theatre, Charlotte Street and Torch Theatre, Knightsbridge
- 1942: Chinese Interlude by Vance Youdan; Torch Theatre
- 1943: Chinese Interlude; Alexandra Theatre, Stoke Newington
- 1943: The Seven Who Were Hanged by Leonid Andreyev; Scala Theatre
- 1944: Madame X by Alexandre Bisson; on tour
- 1945: Madame X; Aldershot
- 1945/46: Christmas Pie: Dr Syn's Christmas segment; New Lindsey Theatre Club
- 1946: Madame X; Hanwell
- 1956: Madame X; on tour
- 1967: Madame X; Bradford
- 1968: Madame X; Nottingham
- 1969: The Case of the Frightened Lady by Edgar Wallace; on tour
- 1970: Elizabeth and Drake by Vance Youdan; Plymouth
- 1971: Great Catherine: Whom Glory Still Adores by George Bernard Shaw; Kensington and Shaw's Corner
- 1971: The Countess of Kopenick by Richard Blomfeld; Barnstaple
- 1971: The Case of the Frightened Lady; Adeline Genée Theatre, East Grinstead
- 1971: Witness for the Prosecution by Agatha Christie; Adeline Genée Theatre
- 1971: Elizabeth of England; Adeline Genée Theatre
- 1971: The Late Edwina Black; Adeline Genée Theatre
- 1971: Murder Without Crime; Adeline Genée Theatre

== Filmography ==
- Darby and Joan (1920), credited as Mary Taviner
- Castle Sinister (1948), credited as Mara Russell-Tavernan; a film version of The Mark of Judas by Vance Youdan
- The Trial of Madame X (filmed 1948, released 1955), credited as Mary Taviner
- The Devil's Jest (1954), credited as Mara Tavernan; a remake of Castle Sinister.

Unconfirmed sources refer to Taviner appearing in several films directed by Maurice Elvey in 1918 and 1919, and in other films in the 1920s.

== Sources ==
- Dalley, Jan (1 May 2000). Diana Mosley. Alfred A. Knopf Inc. ISBN 978-0394587363.
- Holmes, Colin (15 August 2016). Searching for Lord Haw-Haw: The Political Lives of William Joyce. Taylor & Francis. pp. 99–122. ISBN 978-1138888869.
- Macklin, Graham (27 March 2020). Failed Führers: A History of Britain's Extreme Right. Routledge. ISBN 9781317448808.
- Spence, Lyndsy (2 March 2015). Mrs Guinness: The Rise and Fall of Diana Mitford, the Thirties Socialite. The History Press. ISBN 978-0750963558.
- St John-McAlister, Michael (10 October 2022). "Facts, Fictions, and Fascism: A Life of Actor Mary Taviner (1909–1972)". Electronic British Library Journal. 2022 7. British Library. doi:10.23636/p6ad-ne87.
- St John-McAlister, Michael (22 June 2023). "The actor, the fascist, and the reincarnated queen". Untold lives. British Library.
- "Ein teuflischer Scherz" [The Devil's Jest]. Der Spiegel (in German). 4 May 1954.
