= Castle Sinister (1948 film) =

1948 British film by Oscar Burn

- Directed by: Oscar Burn
- Screenplay by: Mary Cathcart Borer (credited as Egan Storm)
- Based on: the play Mark of Judas by Vance Youdan (credited as Vance Youden)
- Produced by: Wm. Howard Borer
- Starring: Mary Taviner (credited as Mara Russell-Tavernan)
- Cinematography: Jeff Davies
- Edited by: N. Goude
- Music by: Cyril E. Clarke
- Production company: Unicorn Film Corporation
- Release date: February 1948
- Running time: 49 minutes
- Country: United Kingdom
- Language: English

Castle Sinister is a 1948 British second feature ('B') mystery film directed by Oscar Burn and starring Mary Taviner (credited as Mara Russell-Tavernan). It was remade in 1954 as The Devil's Jest, again starring Mary Taviner.

During the Second World War, a military intelligence officer travels to Glenye Castle in Scotland to investigate the death of an officer and the disappearance of another. Both are attributed to the castle's mysterious phantom but actually are the work of an enemy agent.

== Plot ==
The Phantom

After visiting Castle Glenye in the Scottish Highlands, Major Matthews of the army's counter-intelligence department is pushed over a cliff by a masked figure, cloaked and hooded in black. Later, his replacement, Captain Fairfax disappears. Captain Neale is sent by the War Office to investigate.

His local contact is Mr. McWerter, who explains in a flashback that, before the outbreak of the Second World War, the Marquess of Glenye died, leaving behind his wife, his first son Michael by a previous marriage, and the present Lady Glenye's own son, Nigel. Lady Glenye is jealous of Michael's position as laird. Nigel volunteers as a private in the army, but Michael is a conscientious objector. Nigel is in love with the local minister's daughter, Jean Hamilton. The castle is rumoured to be haunted by the late Lord Glenye's ghost, known as 'the Phantom'.

During the war, Nigel returns on leave as a captain. He breaks his leg in a riding accident and is nursed by Jean, but has still not recovered six months later, and cannot return to duty.

Lord Glenye's rifle is found to be missing, and the missing Captain Fairfax is discovered on the Glenye estate, shot dead. Searchers see the Phantom, who is also encountered by the cook and the local police constable.

Michael says he is leaving the castle on business; Nigel's doctor, Major Selwyn comes to the castle, and Lady Glenye recognises him. Captain Neale visits to enquire about Matthews, but Selwyn says his questions are impolite and demands he leave. Lady Glenye finds the phone has been cut off, and clearly distrusts Selwyn and gets a revolver.

The Phantom attacks the chauffeur and ties up the housekeeper. Lady Glenye confronts the Phantom but is captured. It is revealed that the Phantom is her son Nigel, and he is working with Selwyn, who is in fact Baron Karl von Reiten, Lady Glenye's former husband and Nigel's father. The cowardly Nigel, with Selwyn's medical authority, has been pretending his leg is still injured so he can avoid returning to war. In return for Selwyn's cover, he has been assisting Selwyn to obtain secret plans of Britain's defences.

Jean, who has been watching, goes for help. Selwyn signals to an incoming German aircraft. Nigel rebels and throws the plans into the fire. Selwyn shoots him, and Michael and McWerter arrive and give chase. Mortally wounded, Nigel shoots Selwyn, who falls down the cliff to his death. The apologetic Nigel dies in his step-brother's arms. Michael tries to conceal Nigel's involvement from Neale, but Neale knows Selwyn had an accomplice. Michael then reveals that he works for British Intelligence. To protect the Glenye family's honour, he lies and says that Nigel was only posing as a Nazi sympathiser, and wore the Phantom costume to spy on Selwyn. Neale tells Lady Glenye to be proud of both of her sons.

== Cast ==
- Mary Taviner (credited as Mara Russell-Tavernan) as Gabrielle, Marchioness of Glenye
- Alistair Hunter as Mr. McTavish, landlord of The Glenye Arms
- James Liggatt as Captain Neale
- Karl Meir as Major Martin Selwyn/Baron Karl von Reiten
- Robert Essex as Nigel Glenye
- Maureen O'Moor as Maggie, the housekeeper
- Myra Celian as Lorna, the cook
- Humphrey Stamford as Constable McWerter
- John Gauntley as Michael Glenye
- Patricia St. John as Jean Hamilton
- Lucien Boré as Captain Fairfax
- Hugh Arnald as Major Matthews
- Harald Melvill as crofter
- Peter Emmott as taxi driver

== Screenplay ==
The screenplay was written by Mary Cathcart Borer (credited as Egan Storm) based on the play Mark of Judas by Vance Youdan (credited as Vance Youden). (Note: Vance Youdan, Youden or Uhden may have been related to Taviner, whose maternal grandmother's surname was Youdan.)

== Themes ==
Castle Sinister reflects the immediate post-war British concerns with the threat posed by Nazism (rather than Communism), and the possible existence of secret Nazi organisations in Britain working to rebuild Germany. It is one of few films of the period to examine the operations of enemy intelligence agents, saboteurs or traitors.

== Reception ==
The Monthly Film Bulletin wrote: "Confusion of plot, poor direction, general miscasting and some acting that can hardly be called professional are the main weaknesses of this undistinguished film."

Kine Weekly wrote: "Its hocus-pocus is enacted by unknown players who, with few exceptions, find it difficult to deliver dialogue clearly. Inarticulate presentation further complicates an already involved tale. Erratic as it is fantastic, its greatest asset is its quota ticket. ... The film is so far-fetched and overcrowded that it frequently runs past itself. The salient situations are bridged by commentary, but the incidental talks fail to act as a brake. Dark in theme and even more darkly photographed, its eerie and uneven tale is anything but complimentary to the Scots. We'll leave it at that."
