= The Unknown Woman (1959 film) =

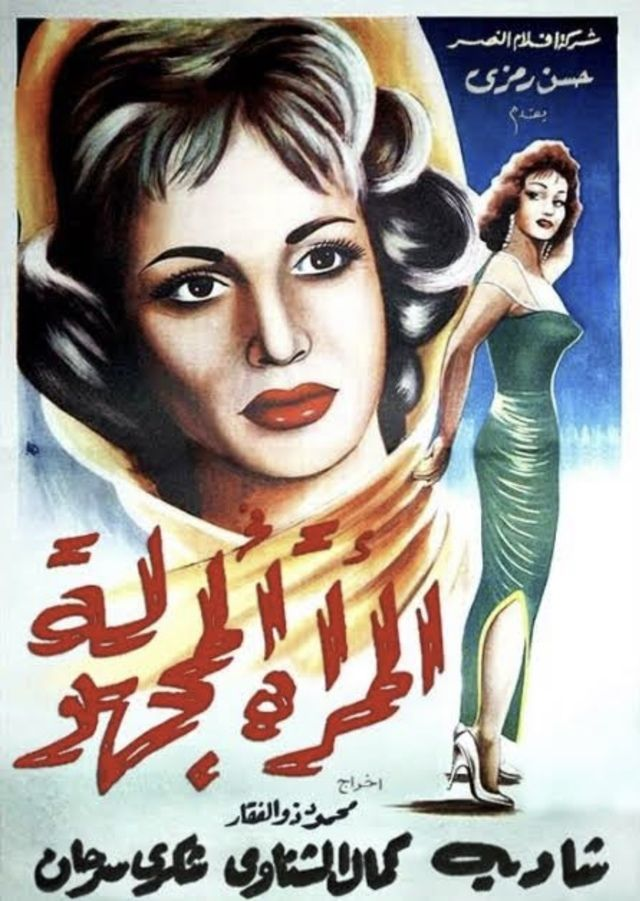
- Theatrical release poster
- Directed by: Mahmoud Zulfikar
- Written by: Mahmoud Zulfikar
- Screenplay by: Mahmoud Zulfikar; Mohamed Othman
- Based on: Madame X by Alexandre Bisson
- Produced by: Hassan Ramzy
- Starring: Shadia; Shoukry Sarhan; Kamal El-Shennawi
- Cinematography: Abdel Halim Nasr
- Edited by: Fekri Rostom
- Music by: Mounir Mourad
- Production company: Al Nasr Films Company
- Distributed by: Al Nasr Films Company
- Release date: 7 December 1959
- Running time: 110 minutes
- Country: United Arab Republic
- Language: Egyptian Arabic

The Unknown Woman (aliases: The Anonymous Woman, Arabic: المرأة المجهولة, romanized: al-marʾa al-majhūla, El-Mara'a el-Maghola, El murra el maghoula) is a 1959 Egyptian film written and directed by Mahmoud Zulfikar. It is based on the play Madame X. The film features an ensemble cast that includes Shadia, Shoukry Sarhan, Kamal El-Shennawi, Emad Hamdy and Zahrat El-Ola.

The Unknown Woman was produced and distributed by El Nasr Films Company and was released in Egypt on December 7, 1959, followed by the worldwide release. The film received high reviews, and It was the highest-grossing film in the Soviet Union for 1961, the only African film to ever achieve this box-office success. The film was remade in 1978 under the title Life is Wasted, My Son (ضاع العمر يا ولدي).

The film revolves in 1930, around Fatima who marries Dr. Ahmed and they give birth to Samir. She goes to visit her friend Souad, the police attack the place because it is suspicious and arrest everyone, including Fatima, she gets released but Ahmed divorces her. Fatima is forced to work as a singer in a Cabaret, the thug Abbas asks Fatima for a sum of money (a royalty) in order to protect her. Selling the lottery tickets, her son Samir becomes a famous lawyer, Abbas gets out of prison, and threatens Fatima in order to blackmail her family, so she kills him, then Ahmed is surprised by what she reached and regrets what he did to her, and her son Samir defends her and his father reveals her truth to him in public in court.

== Plot ==
In 1930, the two girls, Fatma El-Sayed and Souad El-Qadi, were working in Sidnawi shops, and they lived together in a small room with no family. At a charity party, they sold flowers to collect donations and met the wealthy Dr. Ahmed Abdel Fattah, and they claimed that they were from a noble family. A feeling arose between Ahmed and Fatima after their many meetings, and when the feeling flared between them, Fatima told him the truth, but she was surprised that he knew everything about her, and married her despite the opposition of his mother, Amina Hanem, and lived with them in their large palace. Meanwhile, her friend Soad met the thug Abbas Abu Al-Dahab, who deceived her and she lived with him without marriage, and her relationship with Fatma was cut off, who gave birth to her son Samir. Three years later, Abbas Abu Al-Dahab called Fatima to tell her that her friend Soad was sick and on the verge of death. She rushed to see her at the pension where she was staying with Abbas. Unfortunately for her, the pension was suspicious and the police raided it and arrested Fatima. She was detained at the police station until her innocence was proven several days later. The doctor had divorced her and sent the divorce papers to the police station. She rushed to the palace to tell Amina Hanem that Ahmed had taken his son and traveled abroad. Fatima returned to live with Souad, who had been released due to her illness. Souad was working in one of the halls and refused to let Fatima slip down the same path. Fatima surrendered to her sorrows and learned to drink alcohol to forget, and lived in the hope that her son would return from abroad.

Souad fell ill and her circumstances worsened and she needed treatment, so Fatima was forced to work in the cabaret as a singer under the name Shams, and she never stopped visiting the palace. Abbas was released from prison and imposed a tax on the workers in the hall, but Fatima refused to pay. Abbas took 2 kilos of oranges and went to Souad to restore the old friendship, but she expelled him. Abbas hit Fatima with a glass neck, but Souad received the blow for her and died, and Abbas was imprisoned. Ahmed and his son Sameer returned from outside, and Fatima saw him and her heart was torn out with joy. She continued to visit the palace for twenty years, during which she was ruined and became fit only for selling lottery tickets to live. Sameer became a lawyer and proposed to the daughter of the nobles, Aida. Abbas was released from prison, went to Fatima and asked her to blackmail her ex-husband, but she refused, so he decided to blackmail him, but she feared the scandal that would befall her son, so she killed him and remained silent. The court appointed her son Sameer to defend her, and fate willed that she sit with her son in prison, talking to her and filling her eyes with him without telling him her secret, as she was killed so that he would not know. In court, and in response to the insistence of her lawyer son, she spoke and told her story without revealing the names. When the court and the prosecution asked her for the names, Dr. Ahmed Abdel Fattah came forward and confessed to everything. The court sentenced her to a reduced sentence of 6 months, which she spent in the trial and investigations, and she was released with her family.

== Staff ==
- Based on: Madame X
- Adaptation: Mahmoud Zulfikar
- Screenplay: Mahmoud Zulfikar and Muhammad Othman
- Director: Mahmoud Zulfikar
- Production: Hassan Ramzy
- Distribution: Al Nasr Films Company
- Cinematography: Abdel Halim Nasr
- Score: Mounir Mourad
- Editing: Fekri Rostom

== Cast ==
- Shadia as Fatima
- Shoukry Sarhan as Samir
- Kamal El-Shennawi as Abbas
- Emad Hamdy as Ahmed
- Zahret El-Ola as Souad
- Nijma Ibrahim as Amina Hanem
- Soher El Bably as Aida
- Soraya Fakhri as Nanny
- Ahmed Lokser as Officer
- Ataouta as dancer
- Fifi Youssef as Mahasen
- Abdul Moneim Saudi as Driver
- Ekram Ezzo as Younger Samir
- Ahmed Sabry as Older Samir
- Anwar Madkour as Police officer
- Monir Fakhry as Bakr
- Abbas El-Dali as Doctor
- George Yordanis as Bar man
- Mimi Gamal as Extra
- Mohamed Hassan Ramzy as Child
