= The Devil's Jest =

1954 British film by Alfred Goulding

- Directed by: Alfred Goulding
- Screenplay by: Vance Youdan (credited as Vance Uhden)
- Produced by: Paul King
- Starring: Mary Taviner (credited as Mara Tavernan; Ivan Craig; Valentine Dyall
- Cinematography: Hal Young
- Edited by: Etta Simpson
- Music by: De Wolfe
- Production company: Terra Nova Productions
- Release date: 1954
- Running time: 64 minutes
- Country: United Kingdom
- Language: English

The Devil's Jest is a 1954 British second feature ('B') film directed by Alfred Goulding and starring Mary Taviner (credited as Mara Tavernan), Ivan Craig and Valentine Dyall.

== Plot ==
Set during the Second World War, the plot scenes are interspersed with stock footage of battle on land, sea and air.

British Military Intelligence discuss missing secret papers, and ask whether the Enderby family could have been harbouring a Gestapo agent, although one family member did their utmost to stop the papers falling into enemy hands.

The widowed Lady Enderby and her family are in their remote castle, which locals believe to be haunted. Lady Enderby covets her stepson Tony's title and estate, which she would prefer for her own son, Victor. Victor's leg has been injured, but he says he wants to get back to the war. Tony is a pacifist. The servants are scared of a ghost, the Phantom, and threaten to go.

Major Warren leaves after dinner, and is struck over the head by a mysterious hooded, cowled and masked figure, the Phantom. Later, his replacement Captain Glynne, follows a stranger to a barn, where the scar-faced stranger uses a radio transmitter. He shoots Glynne dead.

Military Intelligence believe both Warren and Glynne got close to the spy before being eliminated, and decide the Enderbys must be screened, especially since Lady Enderby's mother was German. Colonel Lorrimer visits the castle. The local police officer is strangled by the Phantom.

Lady Irma wants a second opinion on Victor's leg injury, but Victor says he trusts the opinion of his doctor, Major Seton. The scar-faced stranger gives the Phantom drugs and papers.

Major Seton arrives; he is the scar-faced stranger, and Lady Enderby recognises him and faints. Rather than take the medicine he prescribes, she gets a revolver. At the window, Seton signals with a torch to a U-boat, and disarms Lady Enderby. It is revealed that he is in fact Baron Kurt von Landorf, and Lady Enderby's old lover. He has taken Seton's identity and killed him. He threatens to take her on the U-boat and hand her over to the Gestapo if she does not help him. She refuses.

The Phantom appears, and Seton removes his mask – it is Victor. He claims that Seton made him a traitor and a murderer; he is not the sort of son Lady Enderby should be proud of: his limp is false so he can avoid returning to the front line, and he is addicted to pain killers. Victor leaves and, to protect him, Lady Enderby reveals to Seton that Victor is his own son. Seton and Lady Enderby reconcile as lovers.

Victor has the secret papers and signals to the U-boat, but he then rebels and threatens Seton with the gun. They fight, and Victor is shot dead. The army arrive, and Seton and Lady Enderby flee to the beach. They are both killed in a gunfight, and the U-boat leaves without them or the papers.

== Cast ==
- Mary Taviner (credited as Mara Tavernan) as Irma, Lady Enderby
- Ivan Craig as Major Seton
- Valentine Dyall as the Director of Military Intelligence
- Derek Aylewood as Victor
- Julian Sherrier as Tony
- Lee Fox as Major Malcolm
- Edward Leslie as Captain Glynne
- Hamilton Keene as Colonel Lorrimer

== Background ==
The screenplay was written by Vance Youdan (credited as Vance Uhden). (Note: Vance Youdan, Youden or Uhden may have been related to Taviner, whose maternal grandmother's surname was Youdan.) Although some sources describe it as a remake of Castle Sinister (1948), there are changes to the plot.

The film was Mary Taviner's final film, and the only one produced by her own company, Terra Nova. She used her acquaintanceship with Ronald, fifth Earl of Norbury to get the Duke of Northumberland to allow Syon House to be used for filming. The film gives an insight into Taviner's far-right views, including her monologue suggesting Britain and Germany should have united against communism rather than warring against each other. In an interview with Der Spiegel, she explained that the idea behind the film was "to forever link the blood-like close bond between Germany and England so that such a 'devil’s joke', as was the last fratricidal war between our peoples, does not repeat itself."

== Reception ==
The Monthly Film Bulletin wrote: "The frail, pretentious and confused story ... is not helped by stolidly unimaginative direction, nor by extremely indifferent use of music and sound. The only interest of the film is that it was mostly shot in Syon House."

Kine Weekly wrote: ""Turgid, espionage melodrama ... the interiors are truly magnificent, but unfortunately neither the script nor the cast reaches a comparable level. Stagey to say the least, it's only suitable for small halls. Very moderate quota." Taviner came in for particular criticism: she "keeps forgetting her accent and exaggerates."

Picturegoer wrote: "Even highly coloured espionage stories should bear some relation to reality when they deal with life in wartime Britain. This one doesn't. ... Acting is in the grand manner, particularly from Mara Tavernan as the aristocrat, but it's an amateurish, under-rehearsed production."

More recent reviewers have also been harsh: Chibnall and McFarline wrote in The British ‘B’ Film: "indifferently directed". NitrateVille wrote: "If the un-opportunity comes about for you to be able to see The Devil’s Jest … please politely excuse yourself for 62 minutes by hook or by crook … avoid this so-called film at all costs. It is so bad."
