= Madame X (1954 film) =

1956 film

- Directed by: Orestis Laskos
- Written by: Alexandre Bisson (play); Orestis Laskos
- Based on: Madame X 1908 play by Alexandre Bisson
- Starring: Cybele; Vana Filippidou
- Cinematography: Dinos Katsouridis
- Edited by: Dinos Katsouridis
- Music by: Takis Morakis
- Release date: 26 March 1956
- Running time: 109 minutes
- Country: Greece
- Language: Greek

Madame X (Greek title I Agnostos) is a 1956 Greek drama film directed by Orestis Laskos. It is based on the 1908 play Madame X by French playwright Alexandre Bisson (1848-1912).

== Plot ==
A woman is thrown out of her home by her jealous husband and sinks into depravity. Twenty years later, she finds herself accused of murder for saving her son, who does not know who she is. He finds himself defending her without knowing her background.

== Cast ==
- Cybele as Lina Flerianos (as Madame Cybele)
- Vana Filippidou as Young Lina
- Giorgos Pappas as Peter Flerianos
- Alekos Alexandrakis as Alkis Flerianos
- Nikos Pilavios as Young Alkis Flerianos
- Lambros Konstantaras as Steven Petrides
- Mimis Fotopoulos as Dimitrakis
- Christos Efthimiou as Manolakis
- Periklis Christoforidis as Lambros
- Gikas Biniaris as Yiannis
- Kyveli Theohari as Eftichia
- Eleni Zafeiriou as Rose, the housekeeper
- Boubouca as Dancer
- Mayia Melayia as Singer

== See also ==
- Madame X
- List of Greek films
