= Madame X (play) =

1908 play by French playwright Alexandre Bisson

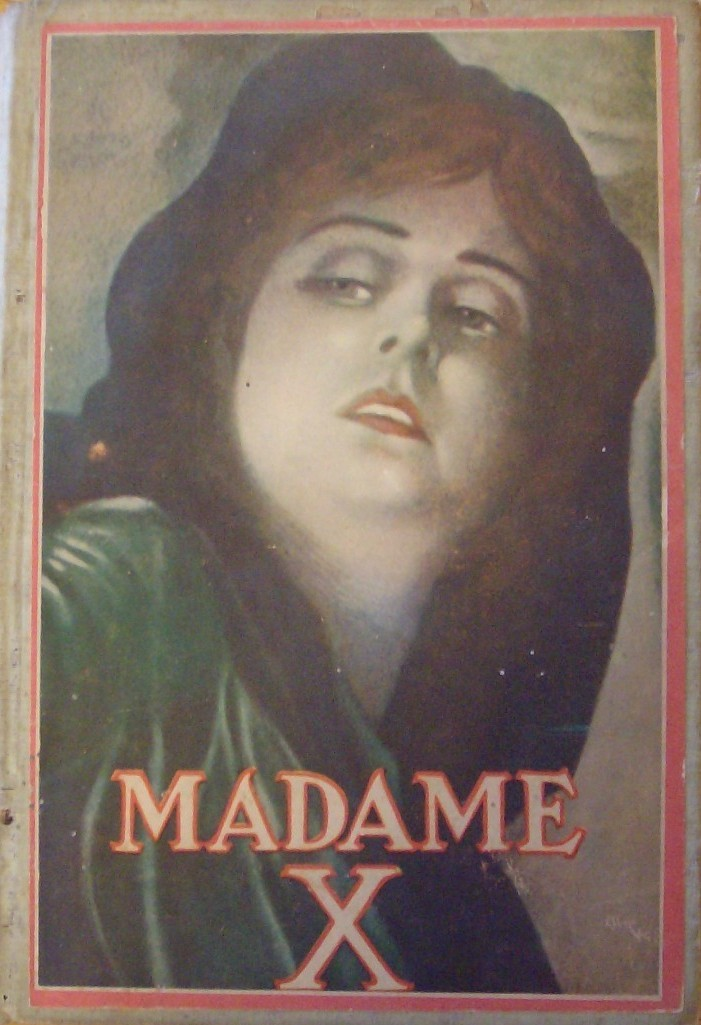
First edition of the novel adaptation by J. W. McConaughy illustrated by Edward Charles Volkert

Madame X (original title La Femme X) is a 1908 play by French playwright Alexandre Bisson (1848–1912). It was novelized in English and adapted for the American stage; it was also adapted for the screen sixteen times over sixty-five years, including versions in Tagalog, Greek, Arabic and Spanish as well as English. The play has been cited as an example of the literary tradition of portraying the mother figure as being "excessively punished for slight deviation from her maternal role".

== Plot ==
The protagonist is a woman who has been thrown out into the street without any money by her jealous husband, when he discovers she has been carrying on an affair. She is not even allowed to see their young son. She sinks into depravity.

Twenty years later, she has become the mistress of a criminal. When he finds out that her husband is now the attorney general, her lover decides to blackmail him. Desperate to shield her son from her disgrace, she shoots and kills her lover.

By chance, the lawyer assigned to her turns out to be her own son, on his first case. He is puzzled and frustrated when she refuses to defend herself in court, or even to provide her name (which forces the tribunal to identify her as "Madame X"). During the trial, her husband shows up in support of his son. When the defendant sees that her husband recognizes her and is about to speak out, she makes an impassioned plea, not for mercy but for understanding of what drove her to murder. As she had intended, the hidden message silences her husband. When she faints from the strain, she is carried into a private chamber. There, she kisses her still-unaware son and dies.

== Adaptations ==
- Madame X, 1910 play, translated to English by John Raphael
- Madame X: A Story of Mother Love, 1910 novelization by J.W. McConaughy
- Madame X, 1916 film starring Dorothy Donnelly
- Madame X, 1920 film starring Pauline Frederick
- Madame X, 1929 film starring Ruth Chatterton
- La Mujer X, 1931 Spanish language remake of the 1929 MGM film, from the same studio.
- Madame X, 1937 film starring Gladys George
- Madame X, 1952 Filipino film starring Alicia Vergel
- Madame X, 1954 Greek film
- The Trial of Madame X, 1955 film starring Mary Taviner
- Madame X, 1955 Mexican film
- Meçhul Kadın [The Unknown Woman], 1955 Turkish film
- The Unknown Woman, 1959 Egyptian film
- Sino Ka, Madame X?, 1966 Filipino film starring Amalia Fuentes
- A Ré Misteriosa, 1966 Brazilian telenovela.
- Madame X, 1966 film starring Lana Turner
- Madame X, 1966 novelization by Michael Avallone of the 1966 film’s screenplay
- Life is Wasted, My Son, 1978 Egyptian remake of The Unknown Woman
- Madame X, 1981 television film starring Tuesday Weld
