= Madame X (1920 film) =

1920 film

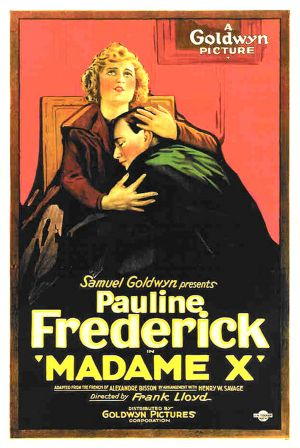
- Film poster
- Directed by: Frank Lloyd
- Written by: J.E. Nash; Frank Lloyd
- Based on: La femme X... 1908 play by Alexandre Bisson
- Produced by: Goldwyn Pictures
- Starring: Pauline Frederick
- Cinematography: Devereaux Jennings (fr)
- Production company: Goldwyn Pictures Corporation
- Distributed by: Goldwyn Distributing Company
- Release date: September 26, 1920
- Running time: 70 minutes
- Country: United States
- Language: Silent (English intertitles)

Madame X is a 1920 American silent melodrama film directed by Frank Lloyd and starring Pauline Frederick. The film is based on the 1908 play Madame X, by French playwright Alexandre Bisson, and was adapted for the screen by J.E. Nash and Frank Lloyd. A copy of this film survives in the George Eastman Museum Motion Picture Collection.

The play was previously adapted for the screen in 1916. The play has been subsequently remade several times.

== Plot ==
As described in a film magazine, jealous husband Louis Floriot, refusing to forgive his wife Jacqueline for fleeing from his wrath and living with the friend who presses his attentions on her, forces her into the life of a derelict. Twenty years later she returns to France from Buenos Aires believing that her son Raymond has died. Laroque, a crook who aids her in her return to France, learns that she is married to a man of wealth, and tries, with the help of his two associates M. Robert Parissard and M. Merival, to get possession of a fortune that rightfully belonged to Jacqueline. To protect her husband from violence, Jacqueline kills Laroque and, accused of murder, is brought to trial. Refusing to confer with her counsel and preferring death to freedom, during the course of the trial she receives the shocking revelation that the defendant attorney is her son Raymond. The tragic story ends with the reunion of the two and the death of the miserable mother.

== Cast ==
- Pauline Frederick as Jacqueline Floriot
- William Courtleigh as Louis Floriot
- Casson Ferguson as Raymond Floriot
- Maude Louis as Rose Dubois (as Maud Louis)
- Hardee Kirkland as Dr. Chessel
- Alan Roscoe as Cesaire Noel
- John Hohenvest as M. Valmorin
- Correan Kirkham as Helene Valmorin
- Sidney Ainsworth as Laroque
- Lionel Belmore as M. Robert Parissard
- Willard Louis as M. Merival
- Cesare Gravina as Victor
- Maude George as Marie

== Censorship ==
It was common at that time for American state film censorship boards to require cuts in films for reasons of morality or to promote the common good. One noted cut in this film required by the Pennsylvania film board was in a scene with Jesus and the woman taken in adultery where an intertitle card with a New Testament verse on sin and casting stones was removed.

== Critical assessment ==
Film historian and biographer Higham, Charles reports that “Frank Lloyd’s best silent film was Madame X (1920), [demonstrating] his polished craftsmanship and advanced control of the language of physical gesture.”:

“Lloyd's direction turned Madame X into a masterpiece of commercial cinema. In the first place, he ensures that every minute detail of French life, the diplomat’s mansion, the shoddy apartment where Madame X (Pauline Frederick) resides, the Hall of Justice, is perfection itself. And there is the matchless command of film pacing, the brilliant use of the iris, the unerring cutting, the pitiless precision of observation. Instead of being a novelette, the film is the equivalent of a Zola novel...In the silent period, only Erich von Stroheim’s Greed (1924) surpassed the physical detail of this creation.”
