= Pontiac Phantom =

Concept car

Pontiac Phantom General Motors Phantom
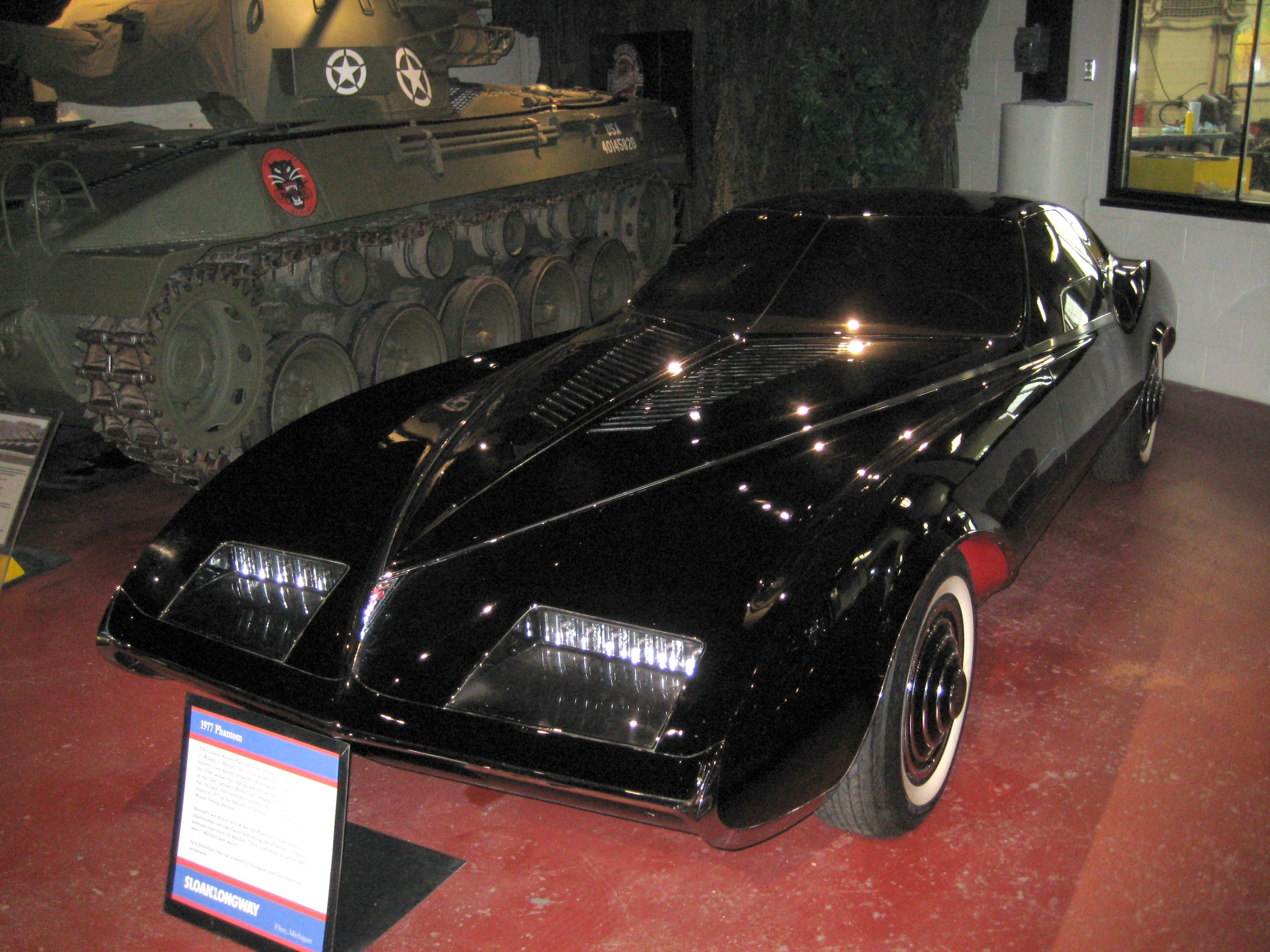

Overview
- Manufacturer: General Motors
- Production: 1977
- Designer: Bill Mitchell; Bill Davis

Body and chassis
- Class: Concept car

Powertrain
- Engine: none
- Transmission: none

Chronology
- Predecessor: Pontiac Banshee
- Successor: Trans Sport Concept

The Pontiac Phantom (also called the General Motors Phantom and given the internal code name "Madame X") is a concept car created by General Motors (GM) in 1977.

The Phantom was designed by Bill Mitchell and Bill Davis at Mitchell's "Studio X". Mitchell was an accomplished designer for GM who had designed the 1938 Cadillac Sixty Special, added tailfins to the 1948 Cadillacs, and designed both the 1963 and 1968 Chevrolet Corvettes.

The Phantom was conceived by Mitchell as a retirement gift to himself and was also the last project for his Studio X, which had reopened to design the car. The lines of the Phantom are evocative of the late-1930s Cadillacs that Mitchell had designed earlier in his career.

The Phantom is a fastback two-seat coupe built on the chassis of a Pontiac Grand Prix. It only consists of a fiberglass shell and does not have a drivetrain, rendering it inoperable.

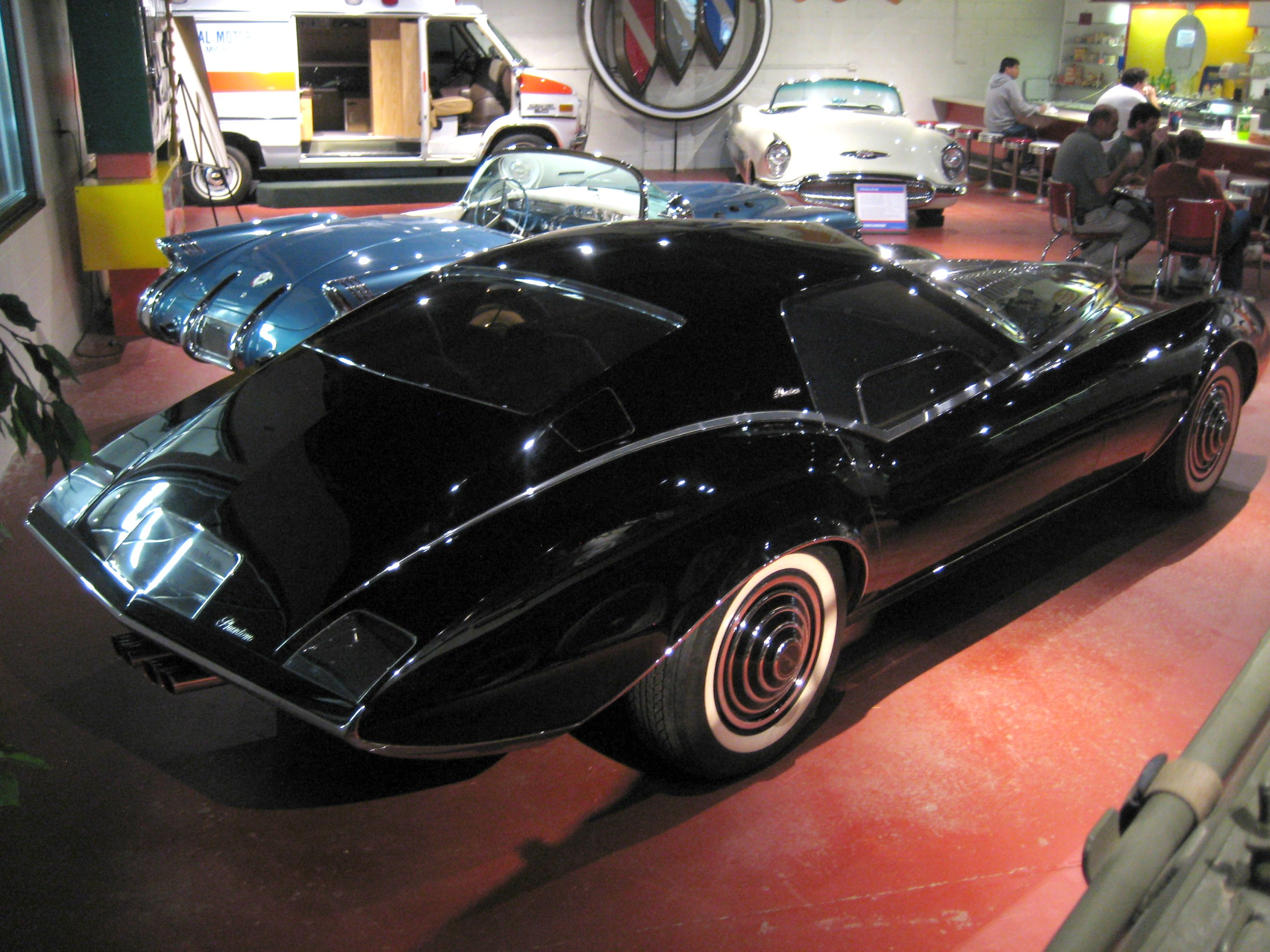
Rear view

The car was considered a "personal expression" of Mitchell's. He described the Phantom as "the kind of car I'd like to drive". Mitchell elaborated that "with the energy crisis and other considerations, the glamour car would not be around for long. I wanted to leave a memory at General Motors of the kind of cars I love." In the words of Jerry Hirshberg, who would later become head of design at Nissan, Mitchell "was fighting old battles and withdrawing increasingly from a world that was being redefined by consumerism, Naderism and an emerging consciousness of the environment".

The Phantom project was initially supported by Pontiac, although they did not maintain support throughout development. Mitchell sent the car to the Milford Proving Grounds with the goal of impressing GM's board of directors. However, when executive vice president of product planning and technical staffs Howard Kehrl saw the car, he ordered it to be removed from the proving grounds immediately.

After designing the Phantom, Mitchell retired in 1977, holding the position of director of the General Motors Styling Division at the time. The car is currently in the collection of the Sloan Museum in Flint, Michigan.
