= Madame X (1955 film) =

- Directed by: Julián Soler
- Written by: Edmundo Báez; Julián Soler
- Based on: Madame X 1908 play by Alexandre Bisson
- Produced by: Gregorio Walerstein
- Starring: Libertad Lamarque
- Cinematography: Gabriel Figueroa
- Edited by: Rafael Ceballos
- Music by: Manuel Esperón
- Production company: Cinematográfica Filmex
- Release date: 7 April 1955
- Running time: 100 minutes
- Country: Mexico
- Language: Spanish

Madame X (Spanish: La mujer X) is a 1955 Mexican drama film directed by Julián Soler and starring Libertad Lamarque.

== Cast ==
In alphabetical order

- Víctor Alcocer
- Emilio Brillas
- Silvia Derbez
- Manuel Dondé
- José Ángel Espinosa 'Ferrusquilla'
- Paquito Fernández
- Miguel Ángel Ferriz
- Víctor Junco
- Libertad Lamarque
- Rodolfo Landa
- José María Linares-Rivas
- Miguel Ángel López
- Julio Monterde
- José Elías Moreno
- Juan Orraca
- Alejandro Parodi
- José Pulido
- Carlos Robles Gil
- Beatriz Saavedra
- Hortensia Santoveña
- Andrés Soler
- Aurora Walker

== Bibliography ==
- Darlene J. Sadlier. Latin American Melodrama: Passion, Pathos, and Entertainment. University of Illinois Press, 2009.
