= Dorothy Donnelly =

American actress (1880–1928)

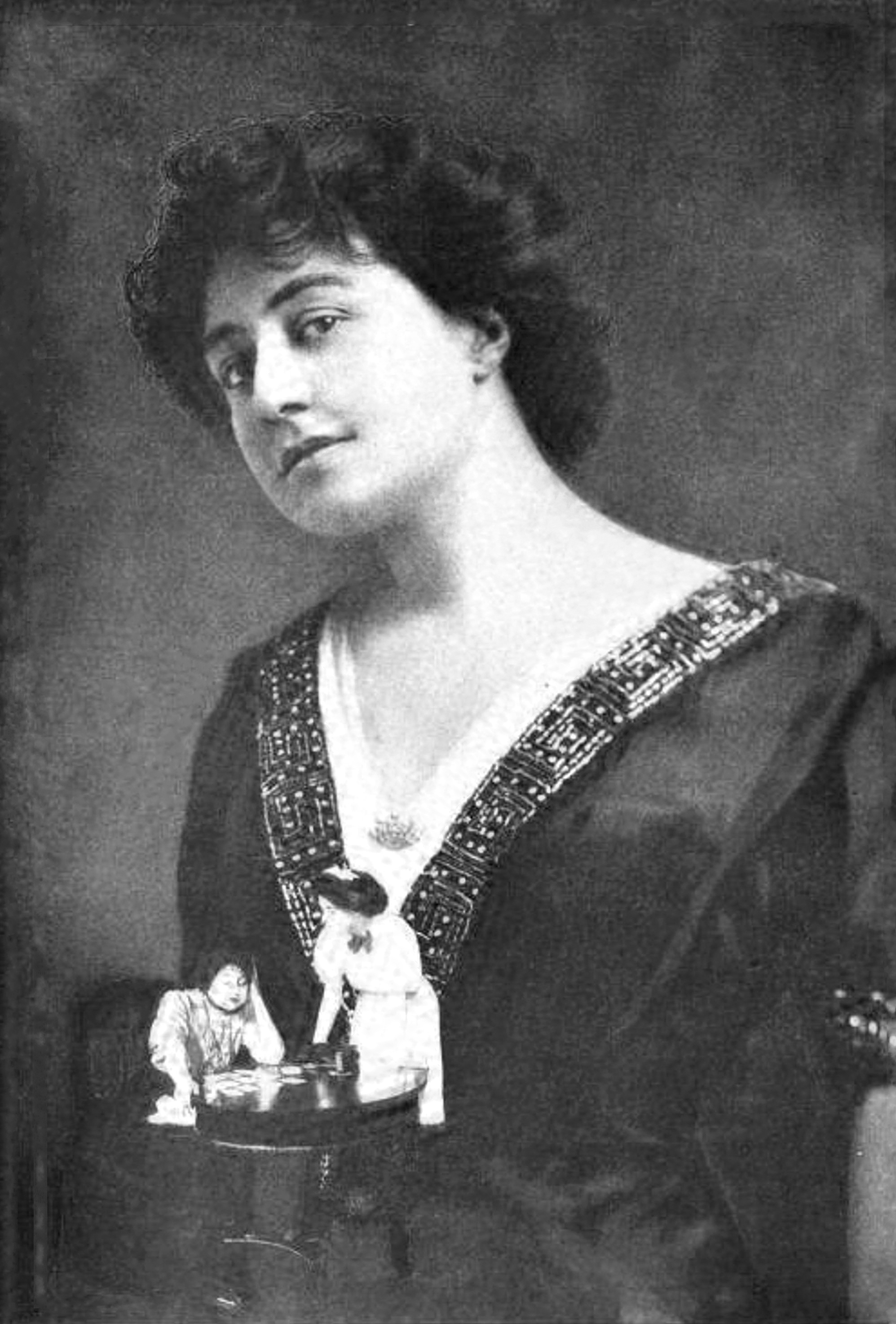
- Born: Dorothy Agnes Donnelly; January 28, 1876; Brooklyn, New York, U.S.
- Died: January 3, 1928 (aged 51); New York City, U.S.
- Occupations: Actress writer lyricist
- Years active: 1898-1928

Dorothy Agnes Donnelly (January 28, 1876 – January 3, 1928) was an American actress, playwright, librettist, producer, and director. After a decade-long acting career that included several notable roles on Broadway, she turned to writing plays, musicals and operettas, including more than a dozen on Broadway including several long-running successes. Her most famous libretto was The Student Prince (1924), in collaboration with composer Sigmund Romberg.

== Life and career ==
Donnelly was born January 28, 1876, in Brooklyn, New York, to Thomas Lester Donnelly (1832–1880), the manager of the Grand Opera House in New York, and his wife Sarah (née Williams). Donnelly attended the Convent of the Sacred Heart in New York.

She began acting on Broadway in 1901, playing the title role in Candida. She made famous the play Madame X on the Broadway stage in 1910 and in a 1916 silent film. She is the subject of a 1999 book by Lorraine McLean Dorothy Donnelly: A Life in the Theatre. She then made a few silent films and then turned to playwriting.

Her first big hit on Broadway was Blossom Time, a 1921 adaptation of a German operetta fictionalizing the romantic life of composer Franz Schubert, using his music and adapting his music. This ran for 516 performances and was revived five times over the next 22 years. She then wrote and directed the musical Poppy (1923) that had a successful run and was adapted for film, boosting the career of W.C. Fields. Her most famous libretto was for The Student Prince (1924), with music by Sigmund Romberg. Her last Broadway hit was My Maryland in 1927. She was also a close friend of playwright Edward Sheldon and after he became bedridden assisted in transcribing, editing, and supporting his work.

=== Death ===
Donnelly died on January 3, 1928, in her apartment at 111 East 34th Street in the Murray Hill neighborhood of Midtown Manhattan. The cause of death was pneumonia and nephritis. She was buried on January 7, 1928, at Gate of Heaven Cemetery in Hawthorne, New York. Donnelly never married.

== Selected works ==
- Flora Bella (operetta), book adaptation (Broadway 1916)
- Johnny, Get Your Gun (play), script revision (Broadway 1917)
- Six Months' Option (play), producer (Broadway 1917)
- Fancy Free (musical), book (Broadway 1918)
- The Riddle: Woman (play; Broadway 1918)
- Forbidden (play; Broadway 1919)
- Blossom Time (operetta), adapted English libretto (Broadway 1921; 1924, 1926, 1931, 1938 and 1943 revivals)
- Poppy (musical), book, lyrics and direction (Broadway 1923)
- The Student Prince (operetta), libretto (Broadway 1924; 1931 and 1943 revivals)
- Hello, Lola (musical), books and lyrics (Broadway 1926)
- My Maryland (musical), book and lyrics (Broadway 1927)

== Theatre roles ==
- Nell Gwyn in Nell Gwyn (1901, Broadway play)
- Madam Alvarez in Soldiers of Fortune (1902, Broadway play)
- Candida in Candida (1903 Broadway play; 1915 revival)
- The Lady in The Man of Destiny (1904 Broadway play)
- Mrs. Maia Rubek in When We Dead Awake (1905 Broadway play)
- Ruth Jordan in The Little Gray Lady (1906 Broadway play)
- Louise Stolbeck in The Daughters of Men (1906 Broadway play)
- Marion Manners in The Movers (1907 Broadway play)
- Jacqueline in Madame X (1910 Broadway play)
- Janet Van Roof in The Right to Be Happy (1912 Broadway play)

== Filmography ==
- The Thief (1914)
- Sealed Valley (1915)
- Madame X (1916)

== Family ==
Dorothy Donnelly was a sister of New York senator and judge Thomas F. Donnelly (1863–1924).

She was also a niece of Fred Williams (née Frederick James Williams; 1829–1900), who had been stage director of Daly's Theatre, stage director of the Lyceum Theatre on Park Avenue, and dean of the faculty of the American Academy of Dramatic Arts. Fred Williams' son, Fritz Williams (1865–1930), was also an actor.
