= Jean Holloway =

American screenwriter

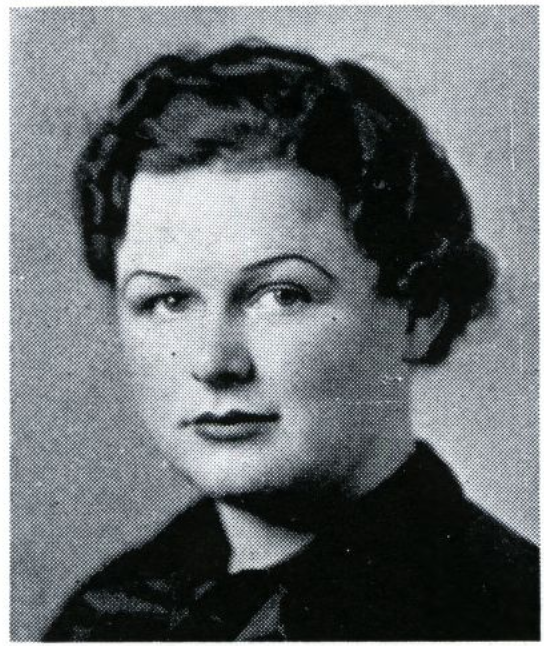
- Pegasus Literary Society - Jean Holloway 1937 San Jose State College La Torre
- Born: Gratia Jean Casey; April 16, 1917; San Francisco, California, USA
- Died: November 11, 1989 (aged 72); Santa Monica, California, USA
- Education: San Jose State University
- Occupation: Screenwriter
- Spouse: Dan Tobin

Jean Holloway (born Gratia Jean Casey; April 16, 1917 – November 11, 1989) was an American film, radio, and television writer who worked in Hollywood from the 1940s through the 1970s.

== Biography ==
Holloway was born in San Francisco, California, to Arthur Casey—an official with the U.S. Department of Justice—and Gratia Holloway. Her parents divorced when she was young.

In the late 1930s Holloway was attending San Jose State University (SJSU) and had already gained notoriety for her writing abilities. From 1937 to 1940 she was writing, directing, and producing radio dramas through SJSU's early radio program, the Radio Speaking Society, which was partnered with San Jose's local radio station KQW, her radio dramas were also aired on San Francisco's local radio station KYA.

At age 17, Holloway left college during her sophomore year and traveled to New York with the hopes of landing a career in acting, however, she was discovered by Ted Collins, the manager of Kate Smith for her radio program The Kate Smith Show and was offered to work on the show.

She later wrote for programs like Hallmark Playhouse (that program's only writer), Mr. President, and The Railroad Hour before moving into writing for film. Holloway's first screenwriting credit was on the 1946 MGM film Till the Clouds Roll By. Though she wrote three musicals for the studio, she was frustrated by MGM's unwillingness to let her write dramas, so she moved primarily into writing for television in the 1950s. After the producer of Wagon Train accepted her first script submission in 1958, he put her under contract to continue writing for the show. She wrote more than 500 episodes of The First Hundred Years, wrote for Peyton Place, and developed The Ghost & Mrs. Muir for television in the late 1960s.

Holloway was married to character actor Dan Tobin, whom she met while working on the daytime soap opera The First Hundred Years.

== Papers ==
Many of Holloway's radio scripts, screenplays, poetry, and coursework from her time at SJSU are stored in San Jose State University Special Collections & Archives.

== Selected filmography ==
- The Magic of Lassie (1978)
- Once Upon a Brothers Grimm (1977) (TV movie)
- Huckleberry Finn (1975) (TV movie)
- The Honorable Sam Houston (1975) (TV movie)
- The Ghost & Mrs. Muir (1968–1970) (TV series)
- Madame X (1966)
- Catch Me If You Can (1959)
- El Coyote (1957) (TV movie)
- A Woman for the Ages (1952) (TV movie)
- Juliette Low and the Girl Scouts (1952) (TV movie)
- Mistress of the White House (1952) (TV movie)
- Florence Nightingale (1952) (TV movie)
- The Big Build Up (1952) (TV movie)
- Words and Music (1948)
- Summer Holiday (1948)
- Till the Clouds Roll By (1946)
