= The Trial of Madame X =

1955 British film by Paul England

- Mary Taviner as Jacqueline
- Directed by: Paul England
- Written by: Paul England
- Based on: play by Alexandre Bisson (uncredited)
- Produced by: F. W. Kilner
- Starring: Mary Taviner
- Cinematography: Ernest Palmer
- Production companies: Viking Film Studios; London
- Release date: 26 June 1955
- Running time: 54 minutes
- Country: United Kingdom
- Language: English

The Trial of Madame X, also known as Jacqueline, is a 1955 British drama film starring Mary Taviner, written and directed by Paul England, who also appears. It was written by England, based on the 1908 play Madame X by the French playwright Alexandre Bisson (uncredited).

The film was made in 1948 but not released until 1955.

== Plot ==
Jacqueline, an alcoholic and drug addict, returns to her hometown of Rouen with her gigolo 'husband', Jean Leroque, travelling by liner and railway. She tells Leroque in flashback why she has returned from Buenos Aires: she is independently wealthy, and was once married to Louis Floriot, a hard-working lawyer, and had a son. However, she found life with Louis dull and she left him for another man. When she was told by Louis' and her best friend Noel Callier that her child was seriously ill, she rushed to his side but was told to leave by her husband. She then left for South America after setting up a fund for her son's education.

Twenty years later, she has returned to find her son. Leroque agrees to search for him and takes money to do so. He meets Jacqueline's former beau, a private detective named Edouard Perrisard. They prepare a plan to blackmail both Louis and Jacqueline Floriot, by threatening to publicise Jacqueline's history and condition. Louis Floriot is now President of the Court of Toulouse, and Louis' and Jacqueline's son Raymond is a promising lawyer; the revelation would endanger both their reputations.

Leroque returns to the hotel, where he tells the drunken Jacqueline that she has to pay to meet her son, and must then return to South America. She suspects blackmail; they have a furious argument, and she shoots him dead. She realises this could destroy her son's career, and so she destroys her identity papers. She is arrested, refuses to give her identity, and is charged as 'Madame X'. Without her knowledge, Raymond Floriot is appointed as her defence counsel. Perrisard learns of Leroque's death and keeps quiet for fear of implicating himself.

Raymond Floriot is engaged to Madeleine Callier, the daughter of the Floriots' old friend Noel Callier, who is now the President of the Court of Rouen. Their families dine together to celebrate. Afterwards, Raymond says that his future career depends on the success of his defence of Madame X. His father is uncertain whether to explain to his son before his marriage that, contrary to what he told his son as a child, his mother did not die but was sent away by him.

At the trial, Louis Floriot recognises his wife, as does Collier, the President of the Court, but they say nothing. Callier advises Louis that if Jacqueline is found not guilty, Raymond must be told. Before he starts his defence, Jacqueline realises her defending counsel is her son, and she breaks down. Raymond Floriot makes a passionate defence of Madame X, arguing that she is evidently protecting someone, and she must have killed Leroque to save someone she loved. She admits that it was for her son's sake she killed him, and all that she desires is for her son to be happy.

While awaiting the verdict, Louis Floriot explains to his son that Madame X is his mother, and what happened twenty years ago. Jacqueline is found not guilty of voluntary homicide and Raymond Floriot wins his case. He reveals to her that he now knows she is his mother, that his remorseful father had tried to trace her after she left the country, and they will be happy now. However, Jacqueline, overcome, dies from the strain.

== Cast ==
- Mary Taviner as Jacqueline
- Frank Hawkins as Jean Laroque
- Paul England as Edouard Perrisard (spelled Perissard at his office)
- Eddie Leslie as Raymond Floriot
- Hamilton Keene as Louis Floriot
- Hamilton Deane as Noel Callier
- Jean Le Roy as Madeleine Callier
- Natalie Raine (also credited as Natalie Rayne) as Julie, the receptionist

== Reception ==
The Monthly Film Bulletin wrote: "Old-fashioned novelette of the crudest order, weakly realised and played in such a theatrical fashion that, if the sound were cut off, one might be prepared to believe one was watching a film of the twenties. In a general atmosphere of fervent over-acting or wooden amateurism, only Paul England, as the blackmailing detective, manages to bring any degree of conviction to his part."

Kine Weekly wrote: "It strikes an unhappy note at the start, clumsily piles on the agony and slowly sinks into bathos. Only the very unsophisticated will find the outmoded shenanigans to their liking. ... The picture, poorly dialogued, as well as crudely acted, teems with incongruities."
