= Gladys George =

American actress (1904–1954)

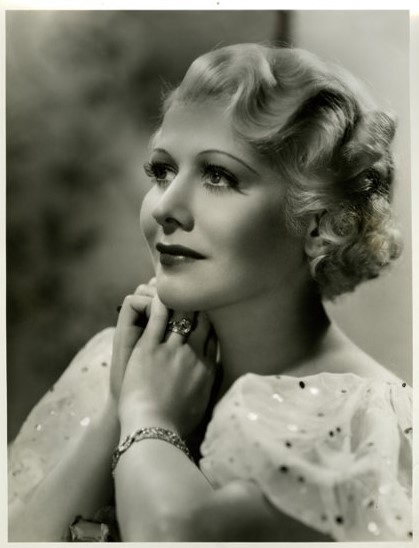
- George in 1937
- Born: Gladys Clare Evans; September 13, 1904; Patten, Maine, U.S.
- Died: December 8, 1954 (aged 50); Los Angeles, California, U.S.
- Resting place: Valhalla Memorial Park Cemetery
- Occupation: Actress
- Years active: 1918–1954
- Spouses: Ben Erway (m. 1922; div. 1930) Edward Fowler (m. 1933; div. 1935) Leonard Penn (m. 1935; div. 1944) Kenneth Bradley (m. 1946; div. 1951)

Gladys George (born Gladys Clare Evans; September 13, 1904 – December 8, 1954) was an American actress of stage and screen. Though nominated for an Academy Award for her leading role in Valiant Is the Word for Carrie (1936), she spent most of her career in supporting roles in films such as Marie Antoinette (1938), The Roaring Twenties (1939), The Maltese Falcon (1941), The Best Years of Our Lives (1946), Flamingo Road (1949), and Lullaby of Broadway (1951) in which marked her first color film.

== Early life ==
George was born on September 13, 1904 in Patten, Maine, to British parents, Sir Arthur Evans Clare, a "noted Shakespearean actor", and his wife, Lady Alice. Another source indicates "Gladys was born in a little town in Missouri, where the troupe her parents belonged to happened to be stranded at the time."

== Career ==
George went on the stage at the age of 3 and toured the United States, appearing with her parents, who were British actors. She starred onstage in the 1920s, and she had made several films during the early part of that decade. For her role in the film Valiant Is the Word for Carrie (1936), she received a Best Actress nomination at the 9th Academy Awards.

Other roles were in Madame X (1937), Marie Antoinette (1938), The Roaring Twenties (1939), The Way of All Flesh (1940), The Maltese Falcon (1941), The Hard Way (1943), The Best Years of Our Lives (1946), He Ran All the Way (1951), Detective Story (1951), and Lullaby of Broadway (1951).

George's Broadway credits include The Distant City, Lady in Waiting, and The Betrothal.

== Personal life ==
Gladys George was married and divorced four times. All of the unions were childless.

- On March 31, 1922, she and actor Ben Erway eloped and were married by a judge in Oakland, California. "They were remarried in San Luis Obispo August 3 of the same year. They separated September 14, 1930." The couple divorced in October 1930.
- Her second husband was millionaire paper manufacturer Edward Fowler, who walked out in 1933 after finding the actress in the arms of her leading man Leonard Penn. At the time, George was playing a nymphomaniacal star in the Broadway hit Personal Appearance.
- George and actor Leonard Penn were married in a probate court in New Haven, Connecticut, September 19, 1935.
- Her last husband Kenneth Bradley, whom she married when she was 41, was a hotel bellboy 20 years her junior.

== Illnesses and death ==
George was afflicted with numerous ailments, including throat cancer, heart disease, and cirrhosis of the liver. She died from a cerebral hemorrhage in 1954 in Los Angeles, California, aged 50, and was interred in the Valhalla Memorial Park Cemetery in Burbank, California.

== Filmography ==
Film
Title	Year	Role	Notes
Red Hot Dollars	1919	Janet Muir	film debut
The Woman in the Suitcase	1920	Ethel	
Below the Surface	1920	Alice	
Homespun Folks	1920	Beulah Rogers	
The Easy Road	1921	Isabel Grace	
Chickens	1921	Julia Stoneman	
The House that Jazz Built	1921	Lila Drake	
Straight Is the Way	1934	Shirley	
Valiant Is the Word for Carrie	1936	Carrie Snyder	Nominated for the Academy Award for Best Actress. Only Academy Award for which Gladys George was ever nominated.
They Gave Him a Gun	1937	Rose Duffy	Co-starred with Spencer Tracy.
Madame X	1937	Madame X / Jacqueline Fleuriot / Miss Pran	Only film starring Gladys George to have been released on VHS.
Love Is a Headache	1938	Carlotta 'Charlie' Lee	
Marie Antoinette	1938	Madame du Barry	First time Gladys George portrayed a historical figure. First supporting role since Oscar nomination.
I'm from Missouri	1939	Julie Bliss	
Here I Am a Stranger	1939	Clara Paulding	
The Roaring Twenties	1939	Panama Smith	James Cagney film with one of many substantial early supporting roles for Humphrey Bogart.
A Child Is Born	1939	Florette Laverne	
The House Across the Bay	1940	Mary Bogel	
The Way of All Flesh	1940	Anna Kriza	
The Lady from Cheyenne	1941	Elsie	
Hit the Road	1941	Molly Ryan	
The Maltese Falcon	1941	Iva Archer	
The Hard Way	1943	Lily Emery	
The Crystal Ball	1943	Madame Zenobia	
Nobody's Darling	1943	Eve Hawthorne	
Christmas Holiday	1944	Valerie De Merode	
Minstrel Man	1945	Mae White	
Steppin' in Society	1945	Penelope Webster	
The Best Years of Our Lives	1946	Hortense Derry	
Millie's Daughter	1947	Millie Maitland	
Alias a Gentleman	1948	Madge Parkson	
Flamingo Road	1949	Lute Mae Sanders	
Bright Leaf	1950	Rose	
Undercover Girl	1950	Liz Crow	
Lullaby of Broadway	1951	Jessica Howard	
He Ran All the Way	1951	Mrs. Robey	
Detective Story	1951	Miss Hatch	
Silver City	1951	Mrs. Barber	
It Happens Every Thursday	1953	Mrs. Lucinda Holmes	
