= Madame X (1916 film) =

1916 film

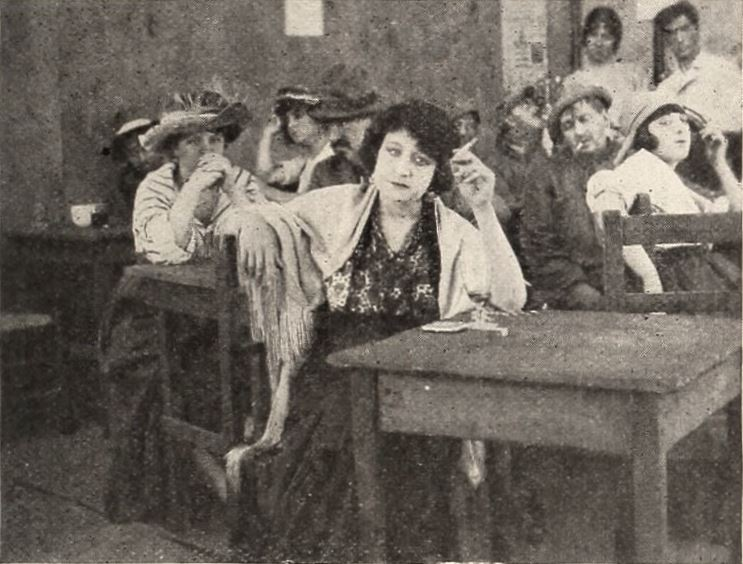
- Film still
- Directed by: George F. Marion
- Based on: Madame X 1908 play by Alexandre Bisson
- Produced by: Henry W. Savage
- Starring: Dorothy Donnelly
- Distributed by: Pathé Exchange
- Release date: January 14, 1916
- Running time: 6 reels
- Country: United States
- Language: Silent (English intertitles)

Madame X is a lost 1916 American silent drama film directed by George F. Marion that was based on the 1908 play of the same name by French playwright Alexandre Bisson (1848 – 1912). Dorothy Donnelly, star of the 1910 Broadway production of the play, which was also directed by Marion, reprised her starring role for the film.

== Plot ==
A woman is thrown out of her home by her jealous husband and sinks into depravity. Twenty years later, she finds herself accused of murder for saving her son, who does not know who she is. He finds himself defending her without knowing her background.

== Cast ==
- Dorothy Donnelly as Jacqueline Floriot
- John Bowers as Monsieur Floriot
- Edwin Forsberg as Laroque (credited as Edwin Fosberg)
- Ralph Morgan as Raymond Floriot
- Robert Fischer as Merival
- Charles E. Bunnell as Perrissard (credited as Charles Bunnell)
- Gladys Coburn as Helene
