= Culture of the United States =

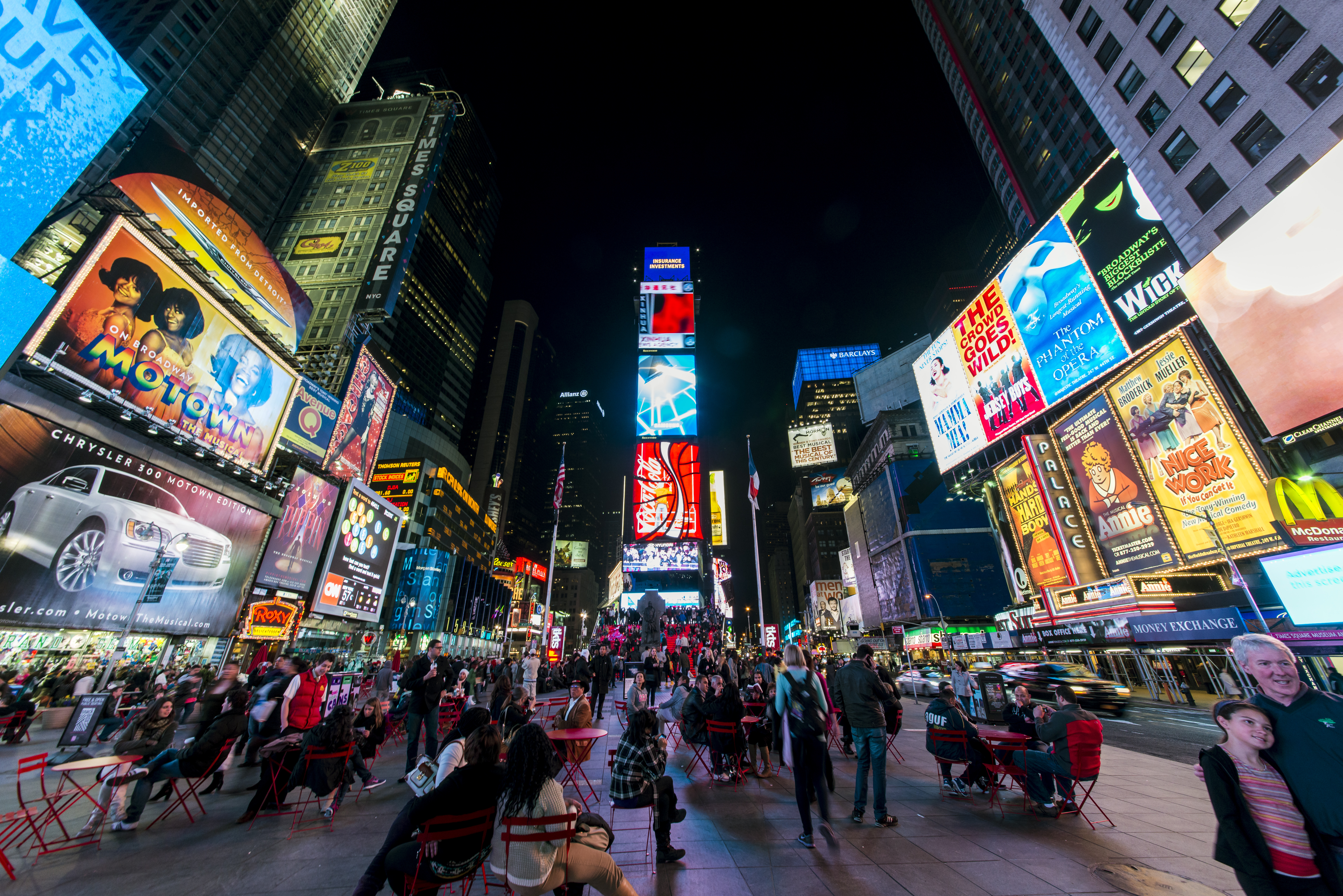
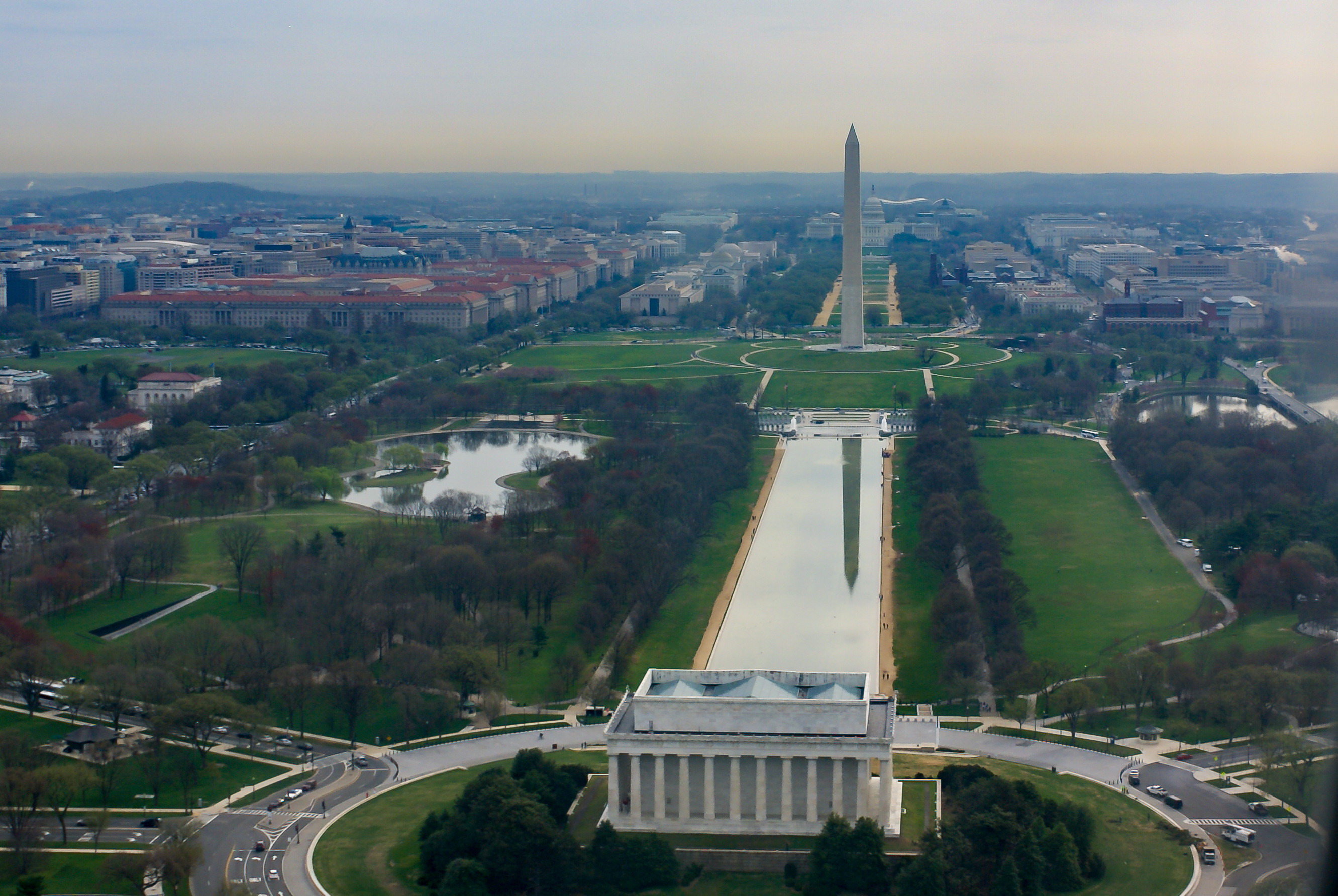
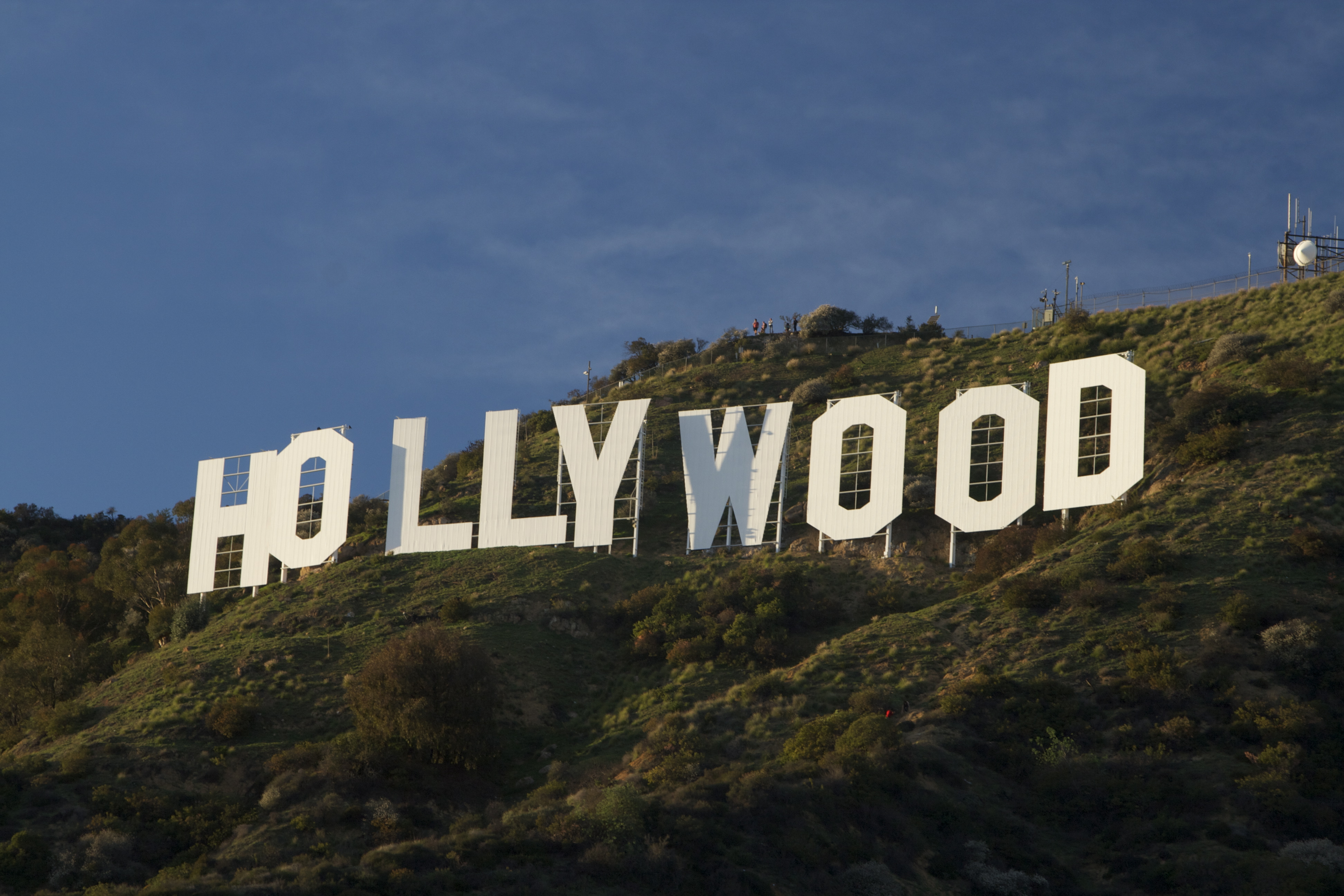
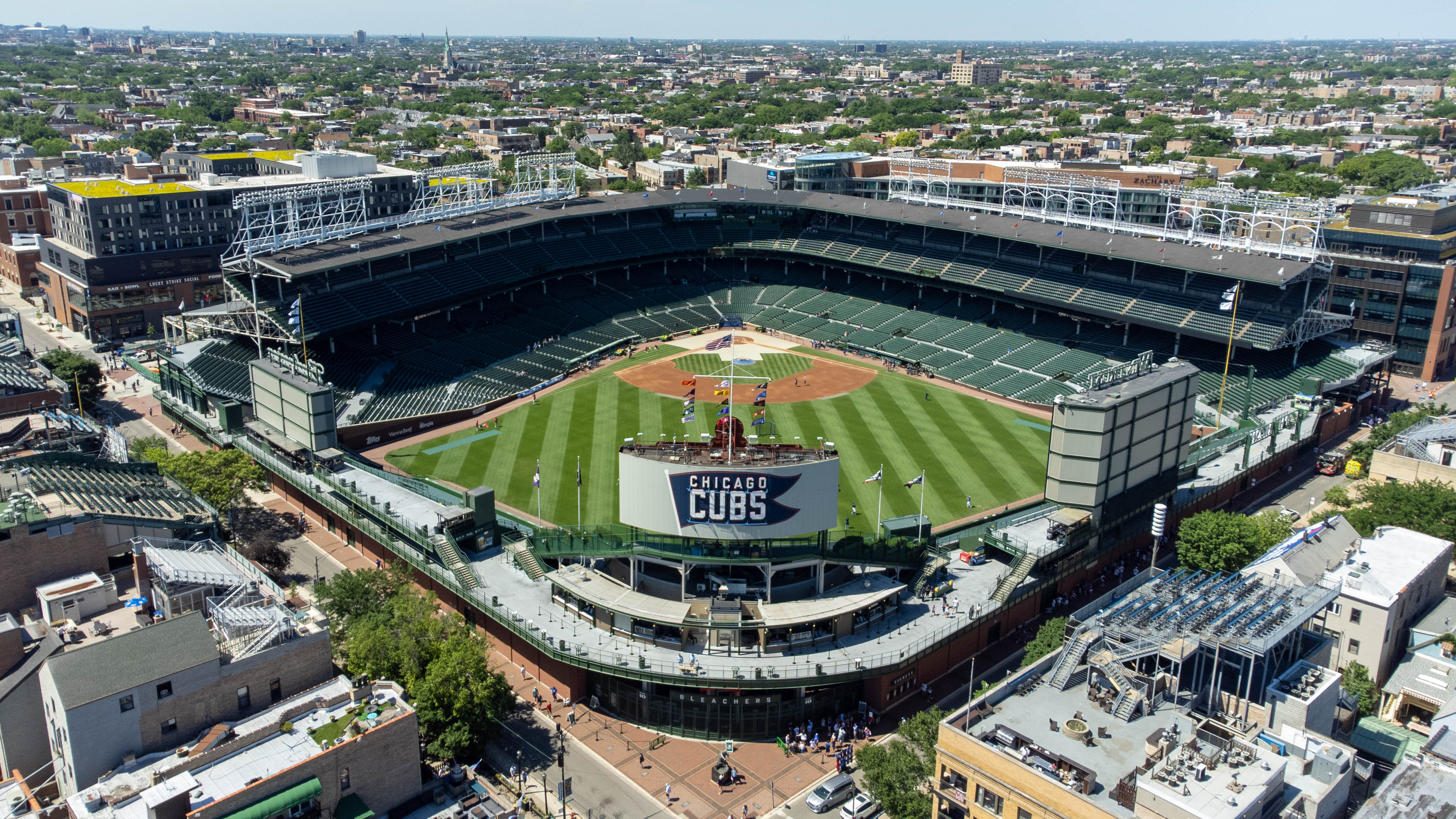
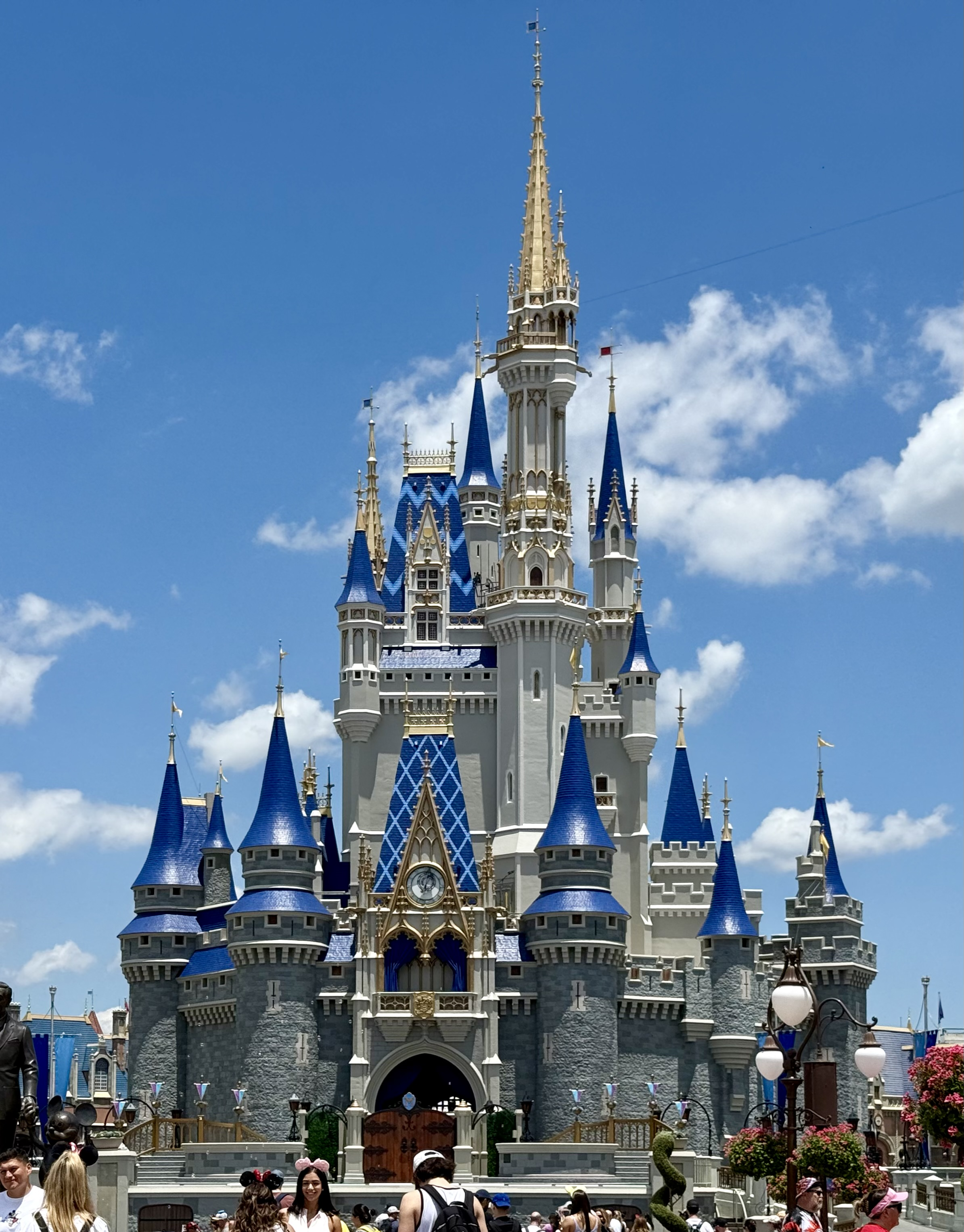
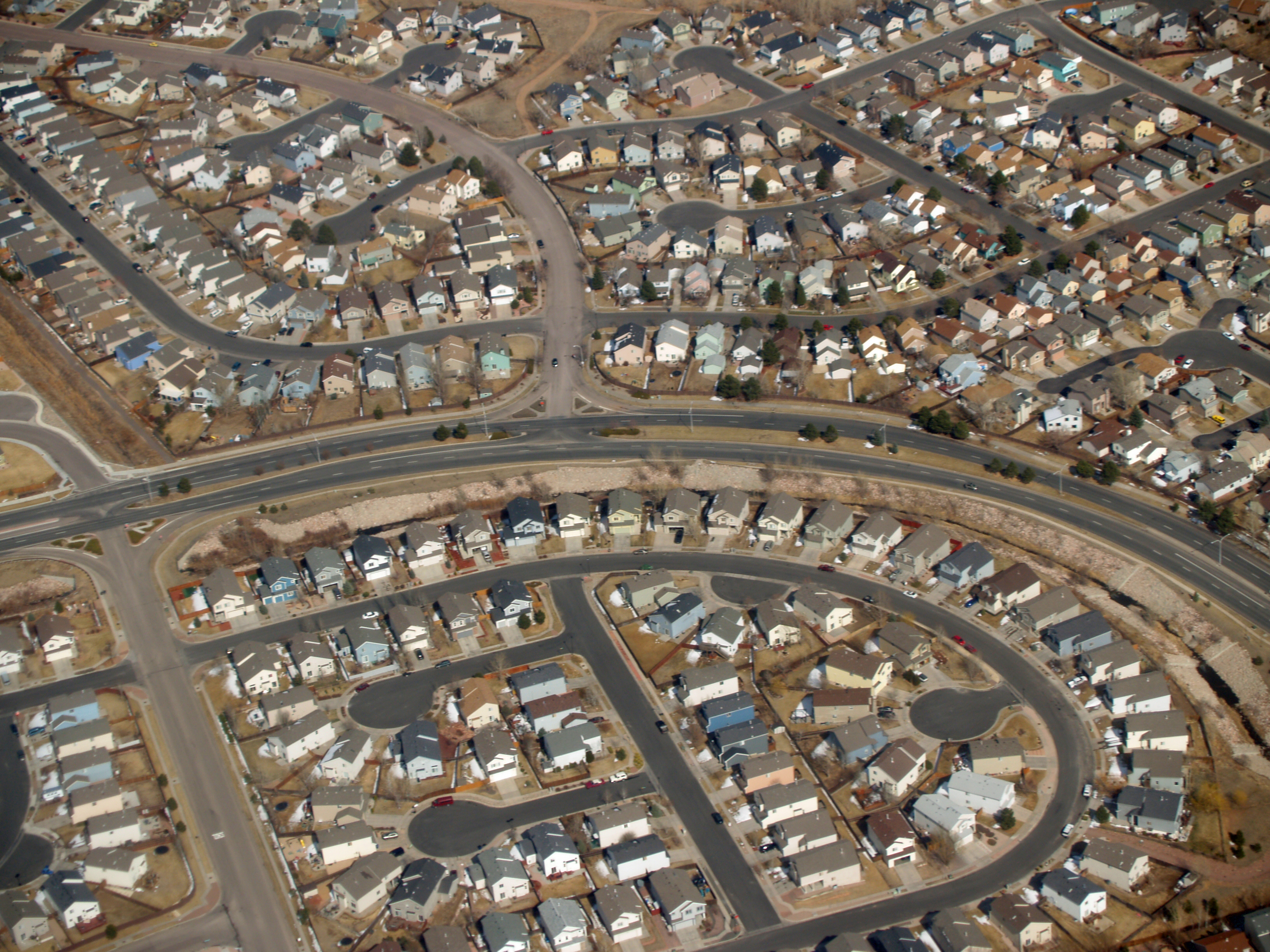
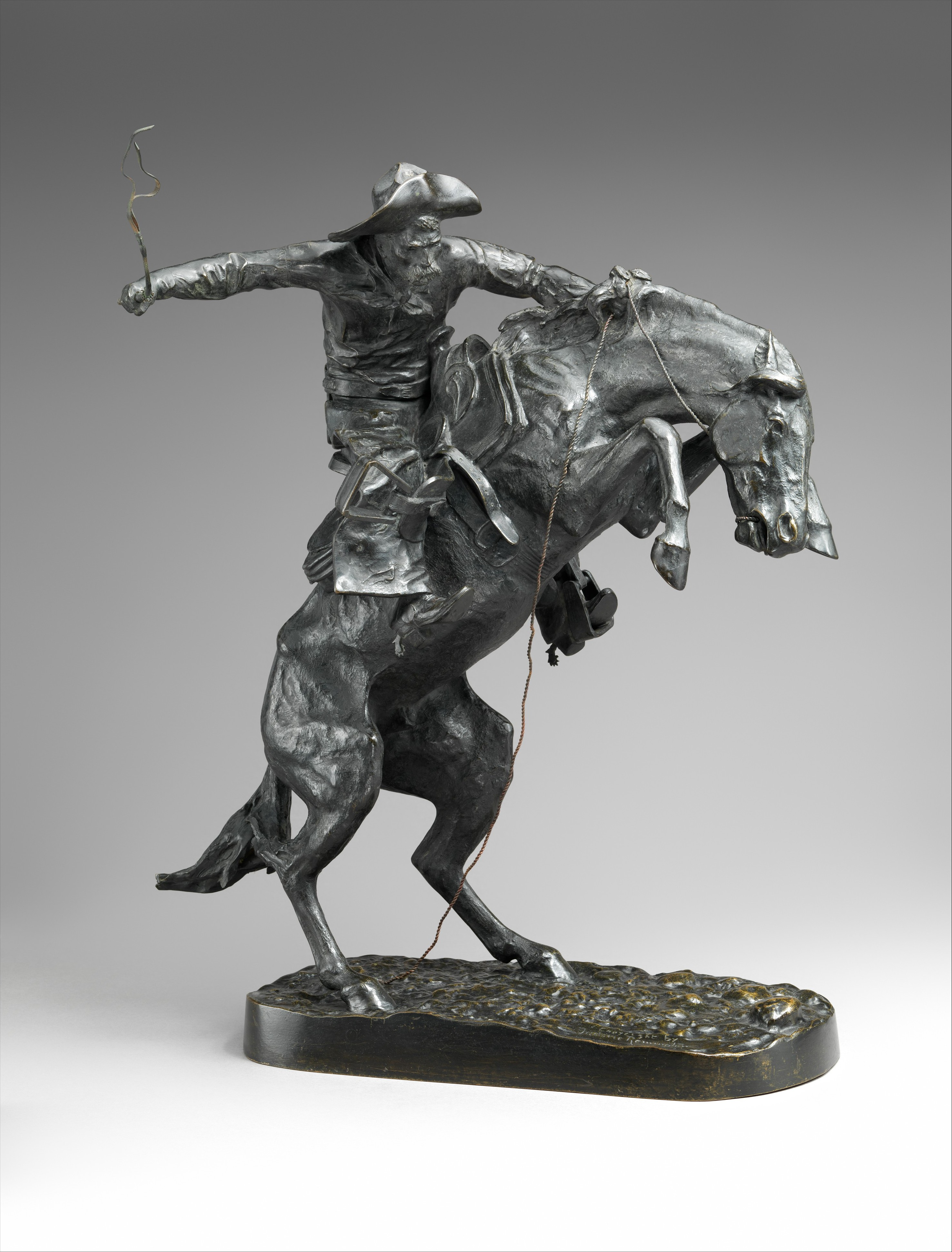
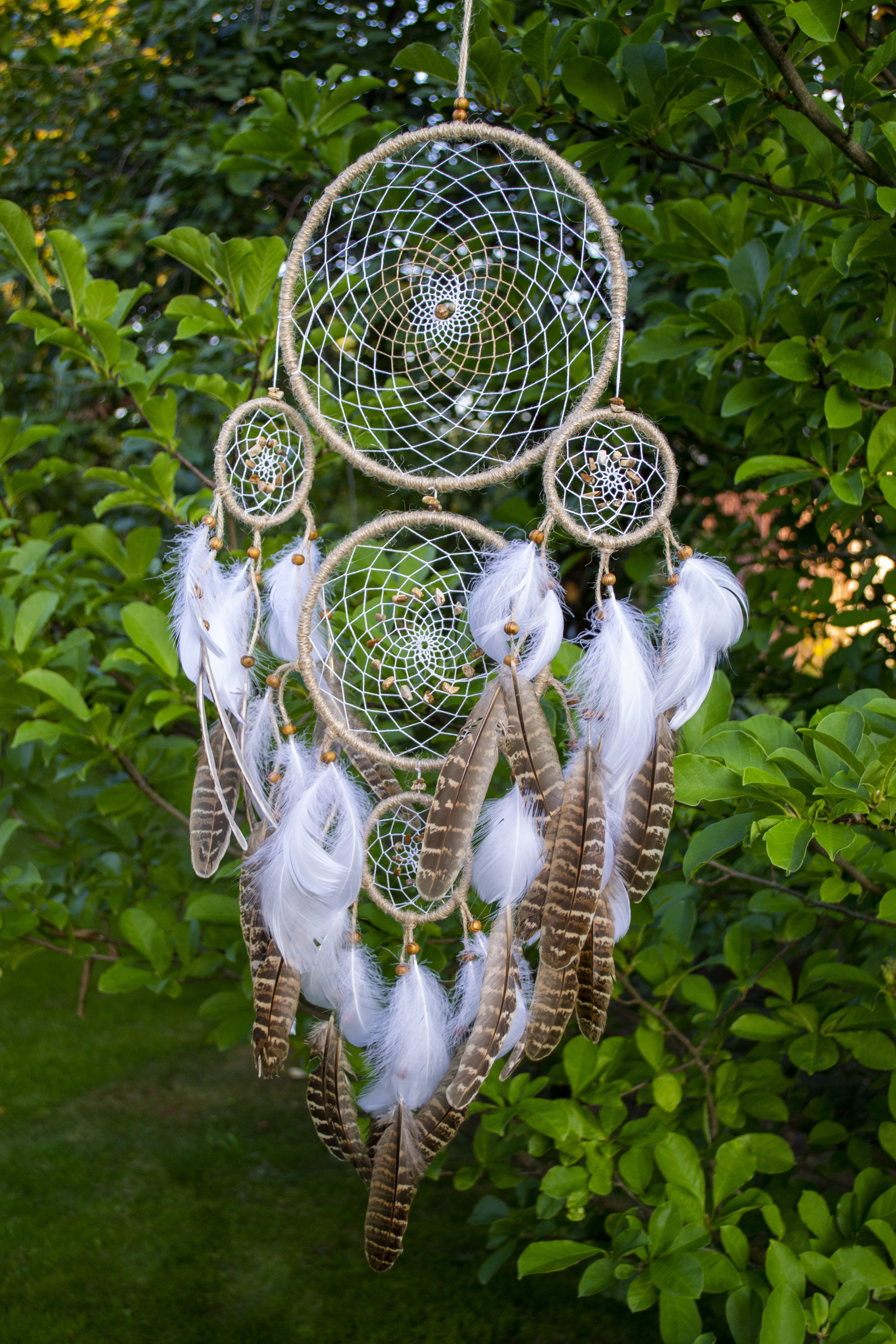
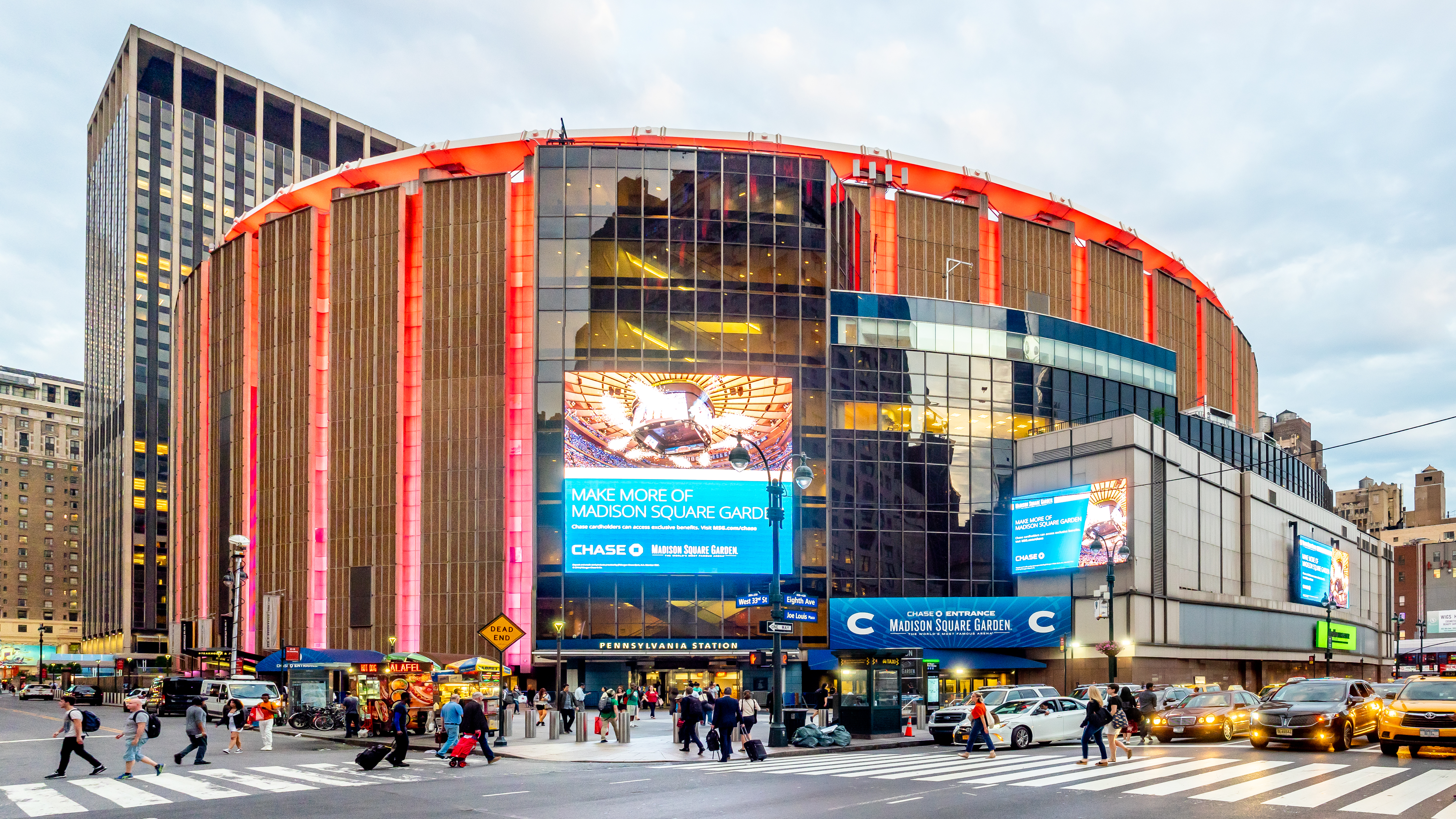
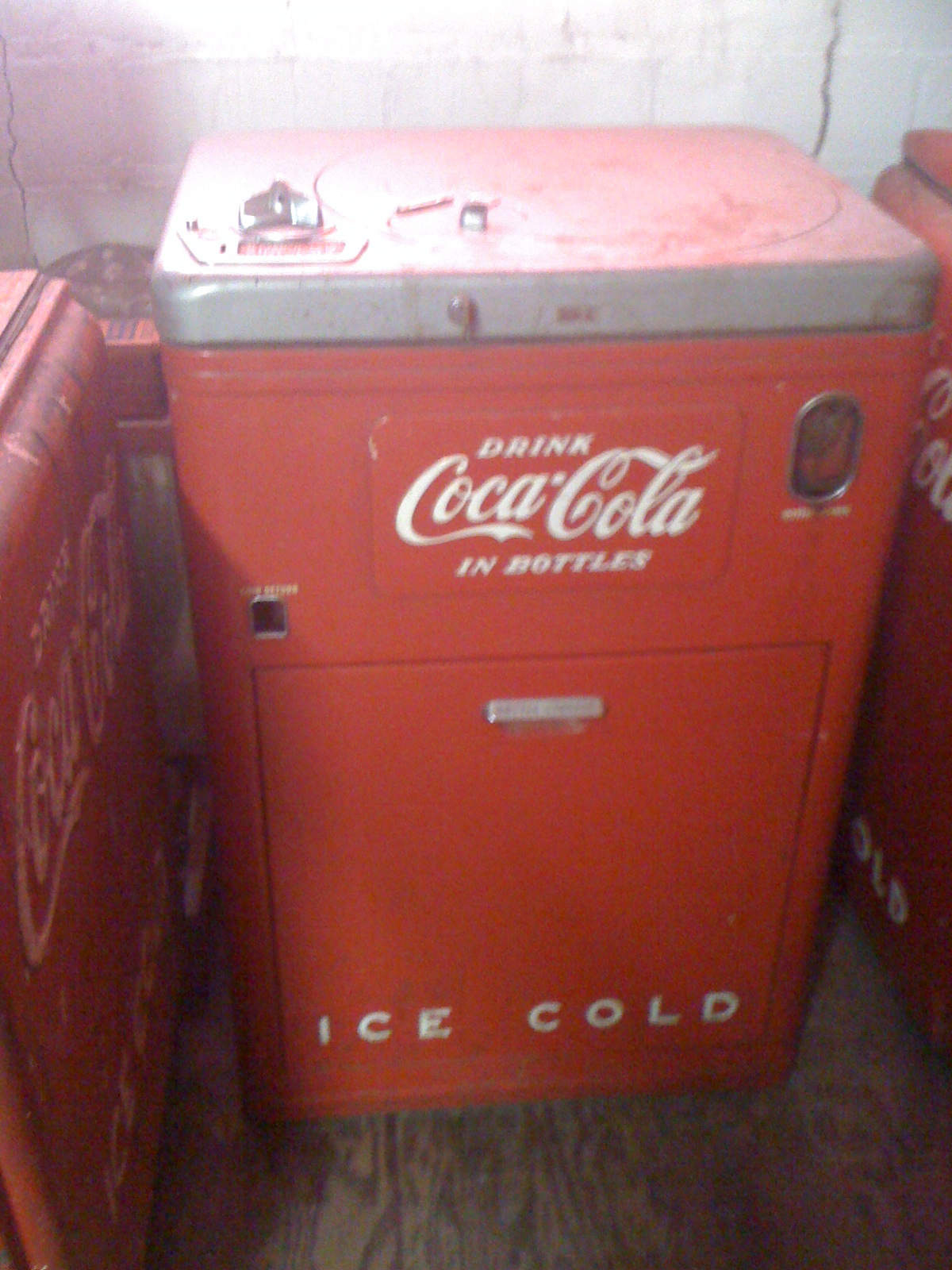
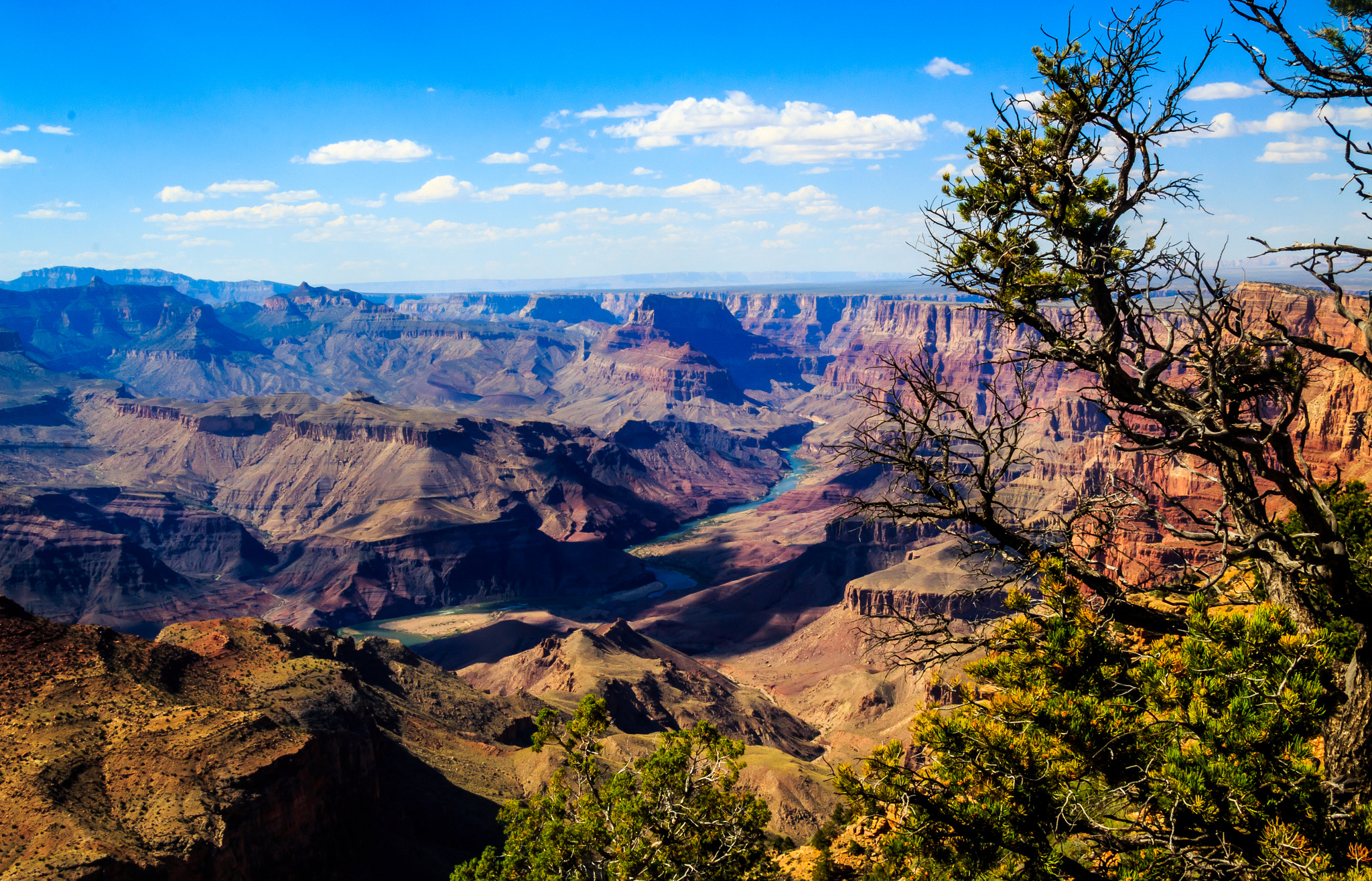
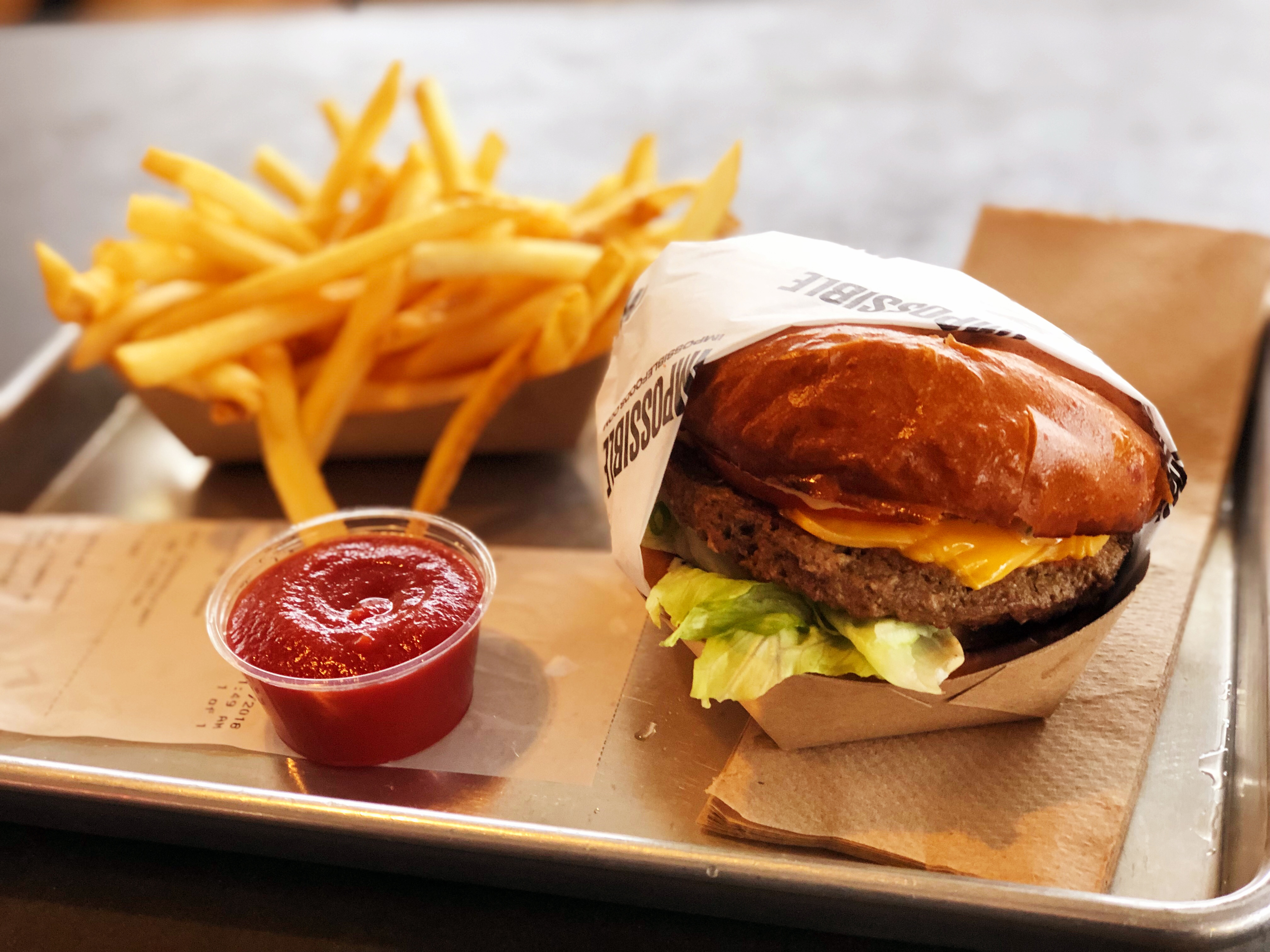
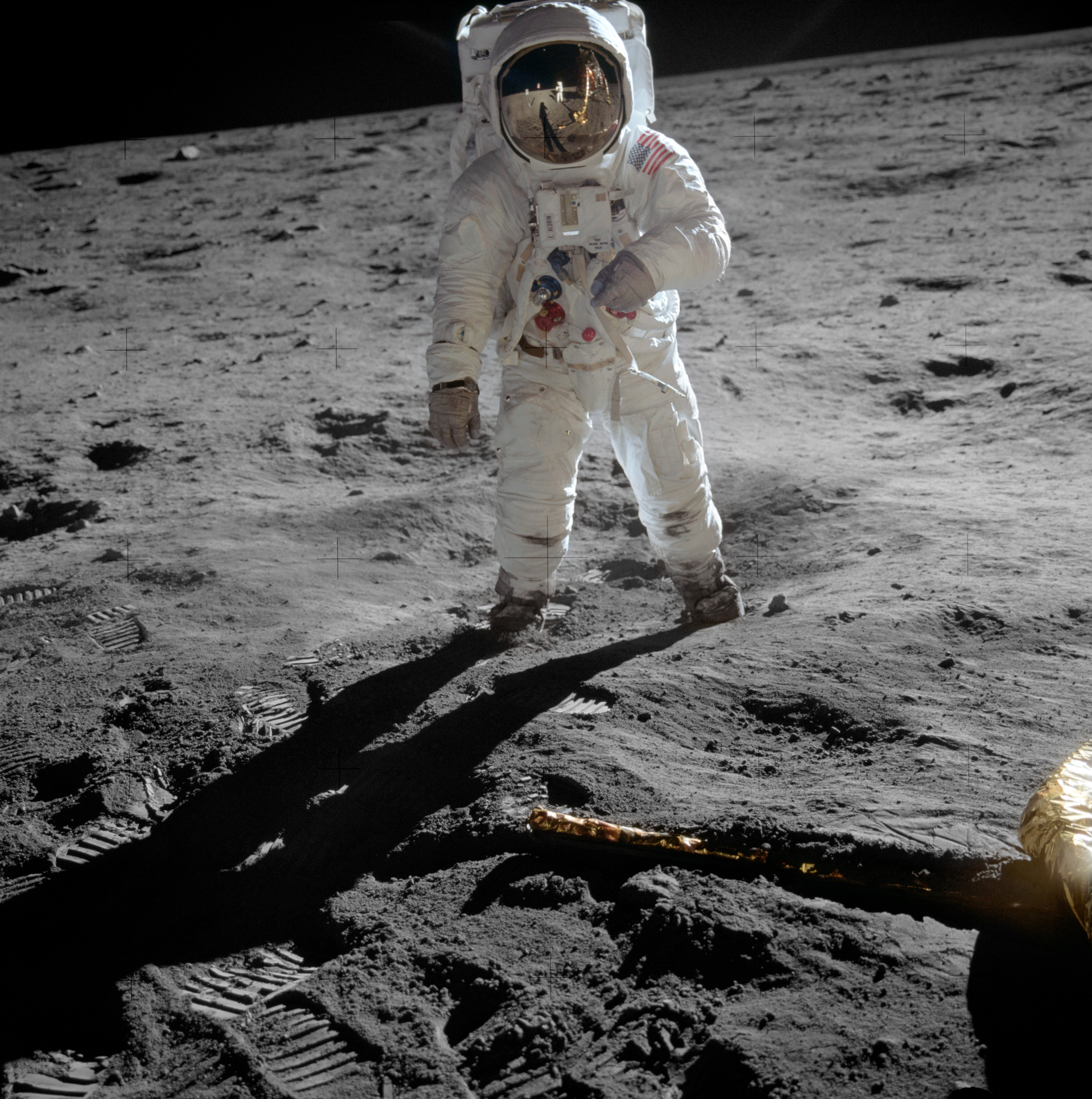
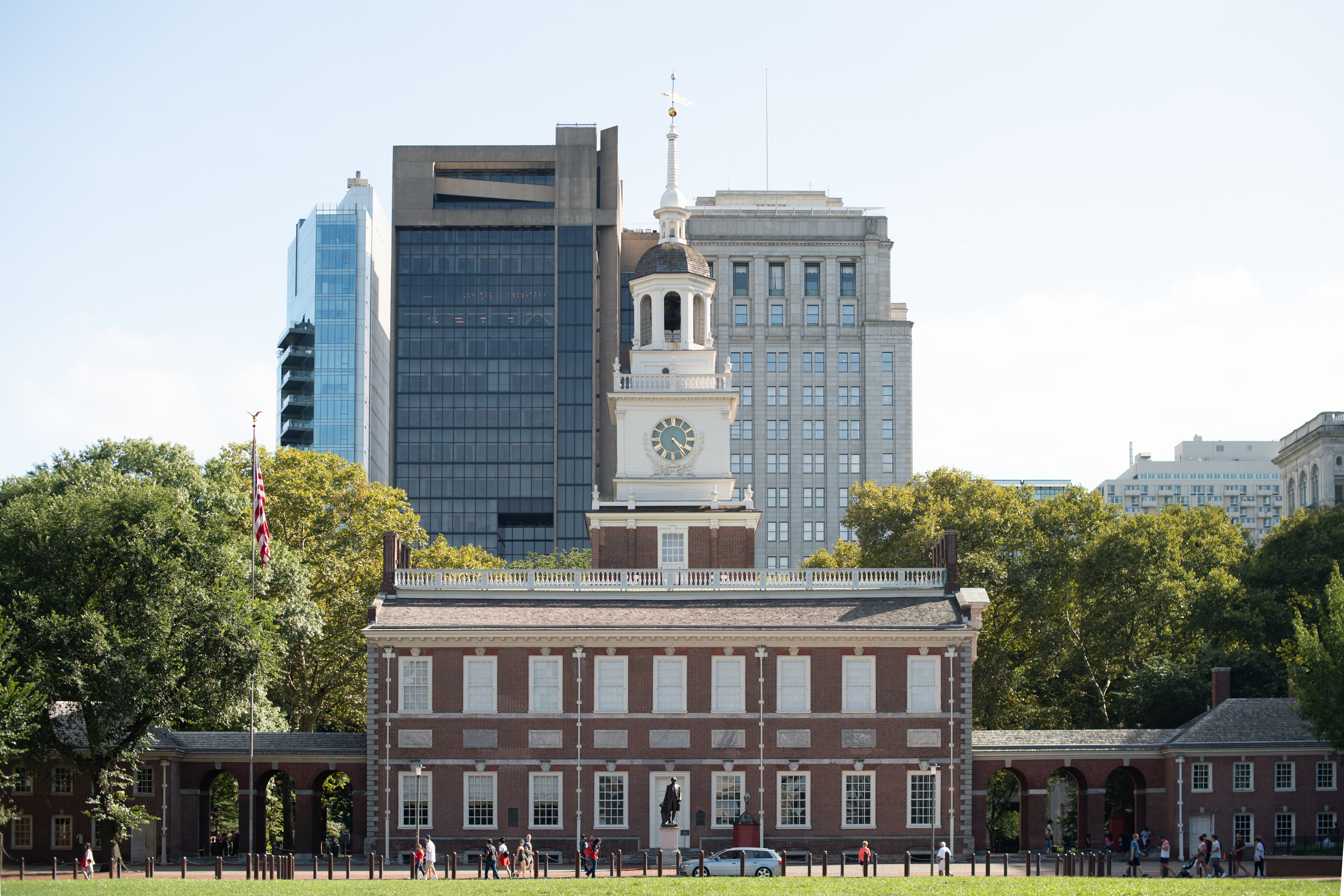
From top, left to right: Times Square, National Mall, Hollywood Sign, Wrigley Field in Chicago, Cinderella Castle, Suburbs, The Bronco Buster, U.S. Route 66, a dreamcatcher, Madison Square Garden in New York City, Coca-Cola, Grand Canyon, Hamburger, Apollo 11, and Independence Hall

The culture of the United States encompasses various social behaviors, institutions, and norms, including forms of speech, literature, music, visual arts, performing arts, cinema, food, sports, religion, law, technology, as well as other customs, beliefs, and forms of knowledge. American culture has been shaped by the history of the United States, its geography, various internal and external forces, and immigration.

America's foundations were initially Western-based, and primarily English-derived, but also with prominent French, German, Greek, Irish, Italian, Scottish, Welsh, Jewish, Polish, Scandinavian, and Spanish regional influences. Hispanic American cultures were also regionally influential since colonial times. However, non-Western influences, including African and Indigenous cultures, and more recently, Asian cultures, have firmly established themselves in the fabric of American culture. Since the United States was established in 1776, its culture has been influenced by successive waves of immigrants, and the resulting "melting pot" of cultures has been a distinguishing feature of its society. Americans pioneered or made great strides in musical genres such as heavy metal, rhythm and blues, jazz, gospel, country, hip hop, and rock 'n' roll. The "big four sports" are American football, baseball, basketball, and ice hockey. In terms of religion, the majority of Americans are Protestant or Catholic, with a growing irreligious population. American cuisine includes popular tastes such as hot dogs, milkshakes, and barbecue, as well as many other class and regional preferences. The most commonly used language is English; while no law designates it official, a 2025 executive order declares English the official language. Distinct cultural regions include New England, Mid-Atlantic, the South, Midwest, Southwest, Mountain West, and Pacific Northwest.

Politically, the country takes its values from the American Revolution and American Enlightenment, with an emphasis on liberty, individualism, and limited government, as well as the Bill of Rights and Reconstruction Amendments. Under the First Amendment, the United States has strong protections of free speech. American popular opinion is also the most supportive of free expression and the right to use the Internet. The large majority of the United States has a legal system that is based upon English common law. According to the Inglehart–Welzel cultural map, it leans greatly towards "self-expression values", while also uniquely blending aspects of "secular-rational" (with a strong emphasis on human rights, the individual, and anti-authoritarianism) and "traditional" (with high fertility rates, religiosity, and patriotism) values together. Its culture can vary by factors such as region, race and ethnicity, age, religion, socio-economic status, or population density, among others. Different aspects of American culture can be thought of as low culture or high culture, or belonging to any of a variety of subcultures. The United States exerts major cultural influence on a global scale and is considered a cultural superpower.

== History ==
=== Origins, development, and spread ===
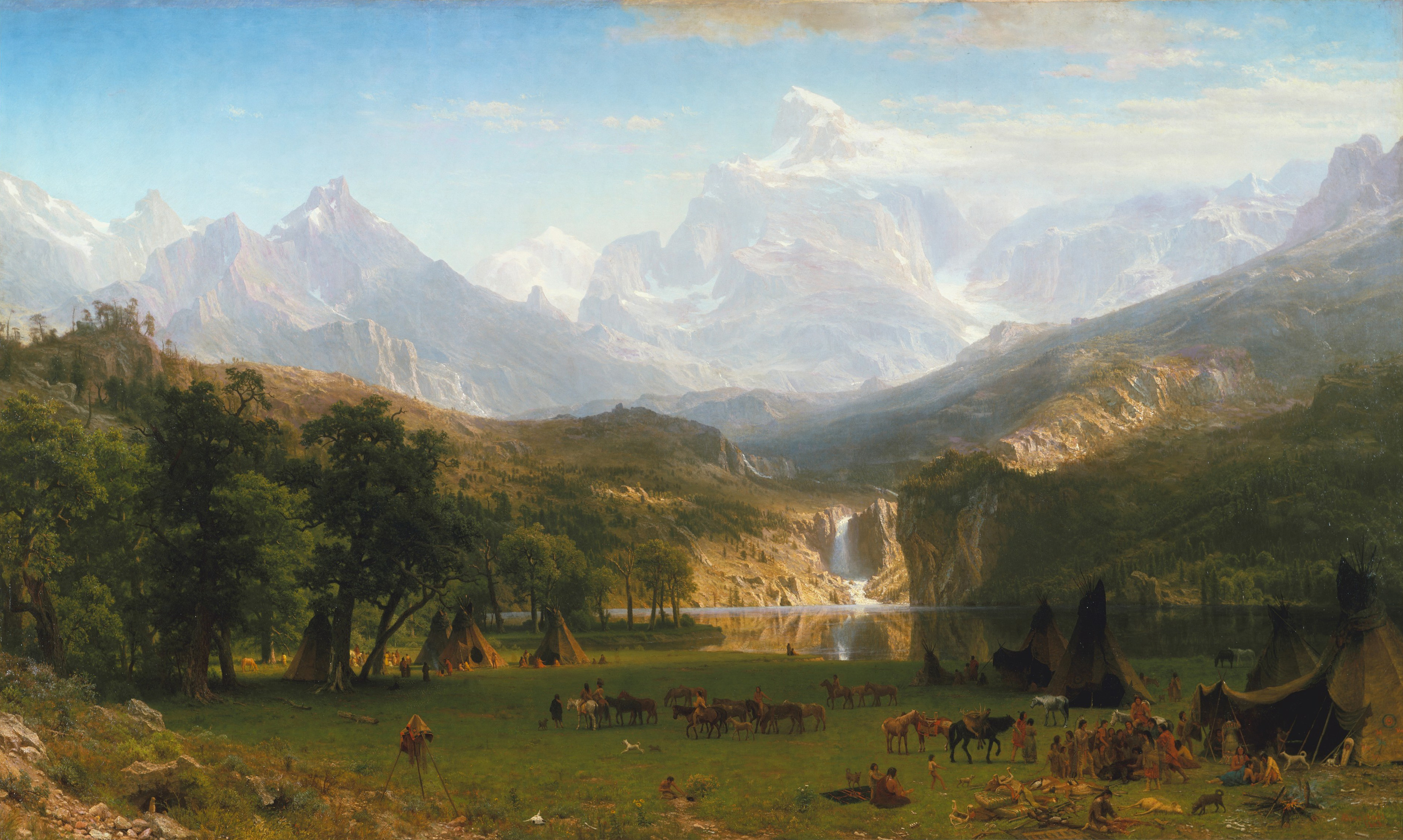
The Rocky Mountains, Lander's Peak (1863) by Albert Bierstadt, at the Metropolitan Museum of Art in Manhattan

The European roots of the United States originate with the English, Spanish, and French settlers of colonial North America during British, Spanish, and French rule. The varieties of English people, as opposed to the other peoples on the British Isles, were the overwhelming majority ethnic group in the 17th century (the population of the colonies in 1700 was 250,000) and were 47.9% of percent of the total population of 3.9 million. These early settlers mostly came from what is referred to as Southern England. They constituted 60% of the whites at the first census in 1790 (%: 3.5 Welsh, 8.5 Scotch Irish, 4.3 Scots, 4.7 Irish, 7.2 German, 2.7 Dutch, 1.7 French, and 2 Swedish). The English ethnic group contributed to the major cultural and social mindset and attitudes that evolved into the American character. Of the total population in each colony, they numbered from 30% in Pennsylvania to 85% in Massachusetts. Large non-English immigrant populations from the 1720s to 1775, such as the Germans (100,000 or more), Scotch Irish (250,000), added enriched and modified the English cultural substrate.

African culture, often transferred through the enslavement of the African diaspora, and contributions from their descendants, African Americans, are also foundational to the culture of the United States.

Jeffersonian democracy was a foundational American cultural innovation, which is still a core part of the country's identity. Thomas Jefferson's Notes on the State of Virginia was perhaps the first influential domestic cultural critique by an American and was written in reaction to the views of some influential Europeans that America's native flora and fauna (including humans) were degenerate.

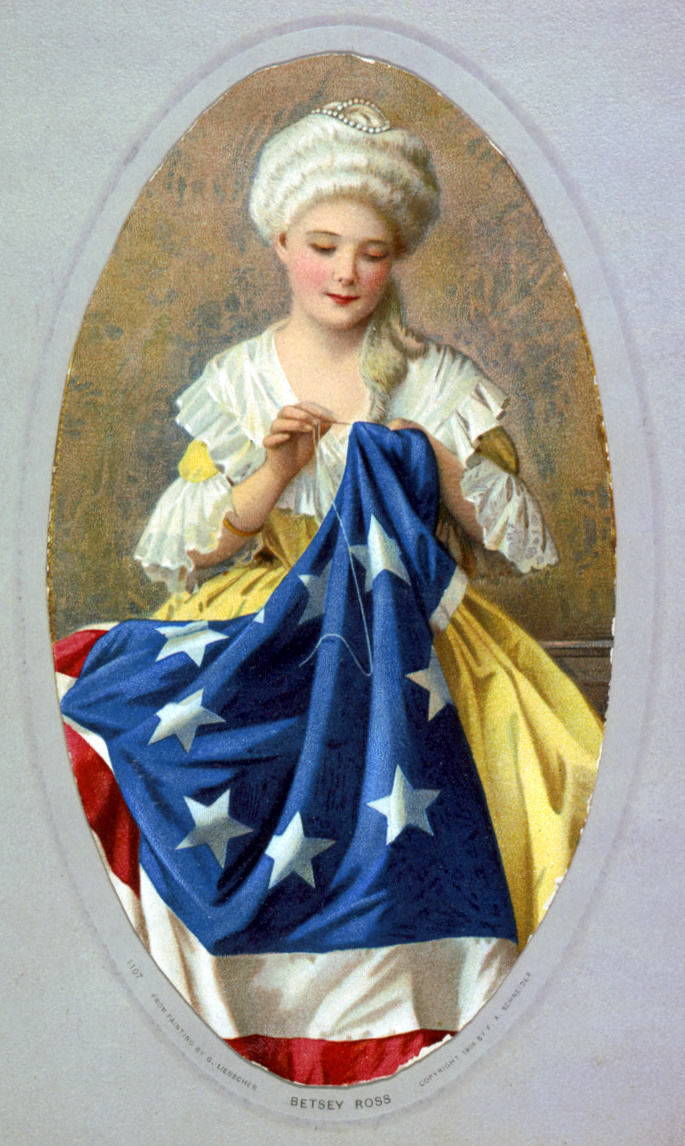
Betsy Ross was an American upholsterer who was credited by her relatives in 1870 with making the first American flag.

Historical immigration brought other non-indigenous cultural influences, especially from Germany in much of the country, Ireland and Italy in the Northeast, and Japan in Hawaii. Latin American culture is especially pronounced in former Spanish areas but has also been introduced by immigration, as have Asian American cultures (especially in the Northeast and West Coast regions). Caribbean culture has been increasingly introduced by immigration and is pronounced in many urban areas. Since the abolition of slavery, the Caribbean has been the source of the earliest and largest Black immigrant group, a significant source of growth of the Black population in the U.S. and has made major cultural impacts in education, music, sports and entertainment.

Indigenous cultures remains strong in both reservation and urban communities, including traditional government and communal organization of property now legally managed by Indian reservations (large reservations are mostly in the West, especially Oklahoma, Arizona and South Dakota). The fate of indigenous cultures after contact with Europeans is quite varied. For example, Taíno culture in U.S. Caribbean territories is undergoing cultural revitalization and, like many Native American languages, the Taíno language is no longer spoken. By contrast, the Hawaiian language and culture of the Native Hawaiians has survived in Hawaii alongside that of immigrants from the mainland U.S. (starting before the 1898 annexation) and to some degree Asian immigrants. Indigenous Hawaiian influences on mainstream American culture include surfing and Hawaiian shirts. Most languages native to what is now U.S. territory are endangered.

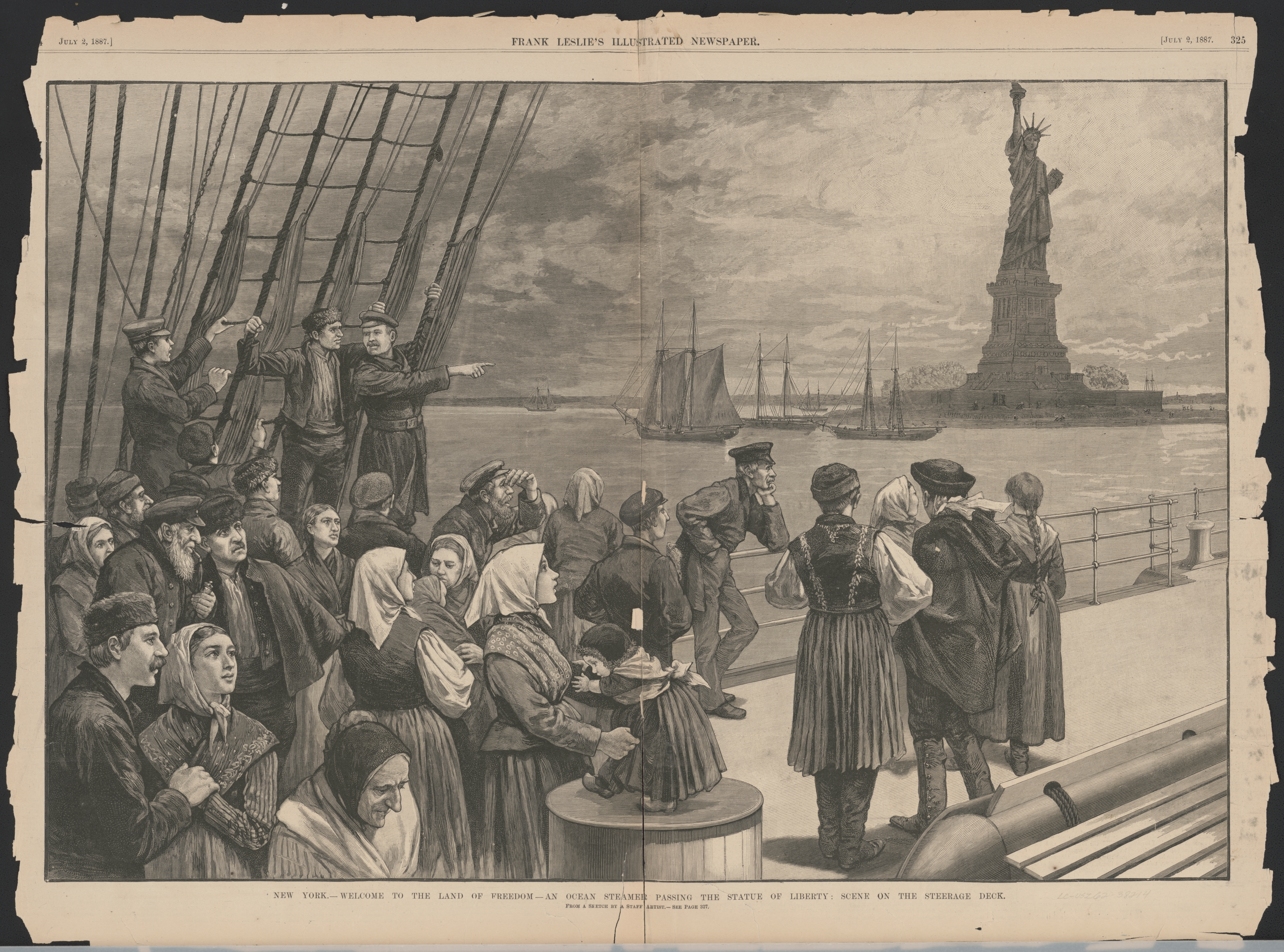
European immigrants arriving in New York City by ship in the late 19th century and early 20th century

American culture includes both conservative and liberal elements, scientific and religious competitiveness, political structures, risk taking and free expression, materialist and moral elements. Despite certain consistent ideological principles (e.g. individualism, egalitarianism, and faith in freedom and republicanism), American culture has a variety of expressions due to its geographical scale and demographics.

As a melting pot of cultures and ethnicities, the U.S. has been shaped by the world's largest immigrant population. The country is home to a wide variety of ethnic groups, traditions, and values, and exerts major cultural influence on a global scale, with the phenomenon being termed Americanization.

== Regional variations ==
Regions of the United States as defined by the United States Census Bureau

According to cultural geographer Colin Woodard there are as many as eleven cultural areas of the United States, which spring from their settlement history. In the east, from north to south: there are Puritan areas ("Yankeedom") of New England which spread across the northern Great Lakes to the northern reaches of the Mississippi and Missouri Rivers; the New Netherlands area in the densely populated New York metropolitan area; the Midland area which spread from Pennsylvania to the lower Great Lakes and the trans-Mississippi upper midwest; Greater Appalachia which angles from West Virginia through the lower midwest and upper-south to trans-Mississippi Arkansas, and southern Oklahoma; the Deep South from the Carolinas to Florida and west to Texas. In the west, there is the southwestern "El Norte" areas originally colonized by Spain, the "Left Coast" colonized quickly on the 19th century by a mix of Yankees and upper Appalachians, and the large but sparsely populated interior West.

The South is sometimes informally called the "Bible Belt" due to socially conservative evangelical Protestantism, which is a significant part of the region's culture. Christian church attendance across all denominations is generally higher there than the national average. This region is usually contrasted with the mainline Protestantism and Catholicism of the Northeast, the religiously diverse Midwest and Great Lakes, the Mormon Corridor in Utah and southern Idaho, and the relatively secular West. The percentage of non-religious people is the highest in the northeastern and New England state of Vermont at 34%, compared to 6% in the Bible Belt state of Alabama.

Strong cultural differences have a long history in the U.S., with the southern slave society in the antebellum period serving as a prime example. Social and economic tensions between the Northern and Southern states were so severe that they eventually caused the South to declare itself an independent nation, the Confederate States of America; thus initiating the American Civil War.

=== Cultures of regions in the United States ===
- Culture of New England
- Culture of the Southern United States
- Culture of the Midwest
- Culture of Western United States
- Appalachian Culture
- Cajun Culture
- Gullah Culture
- Missouri Rhineland Culture
- Pennsylvania Dutch/Ohio Amish Culture
- Culture of the Pacific Northwest
- Cowboy Culture
- Culture of Hawaii
- Culture of Alaska
- Culture of Puerto Rico

== Languages ==
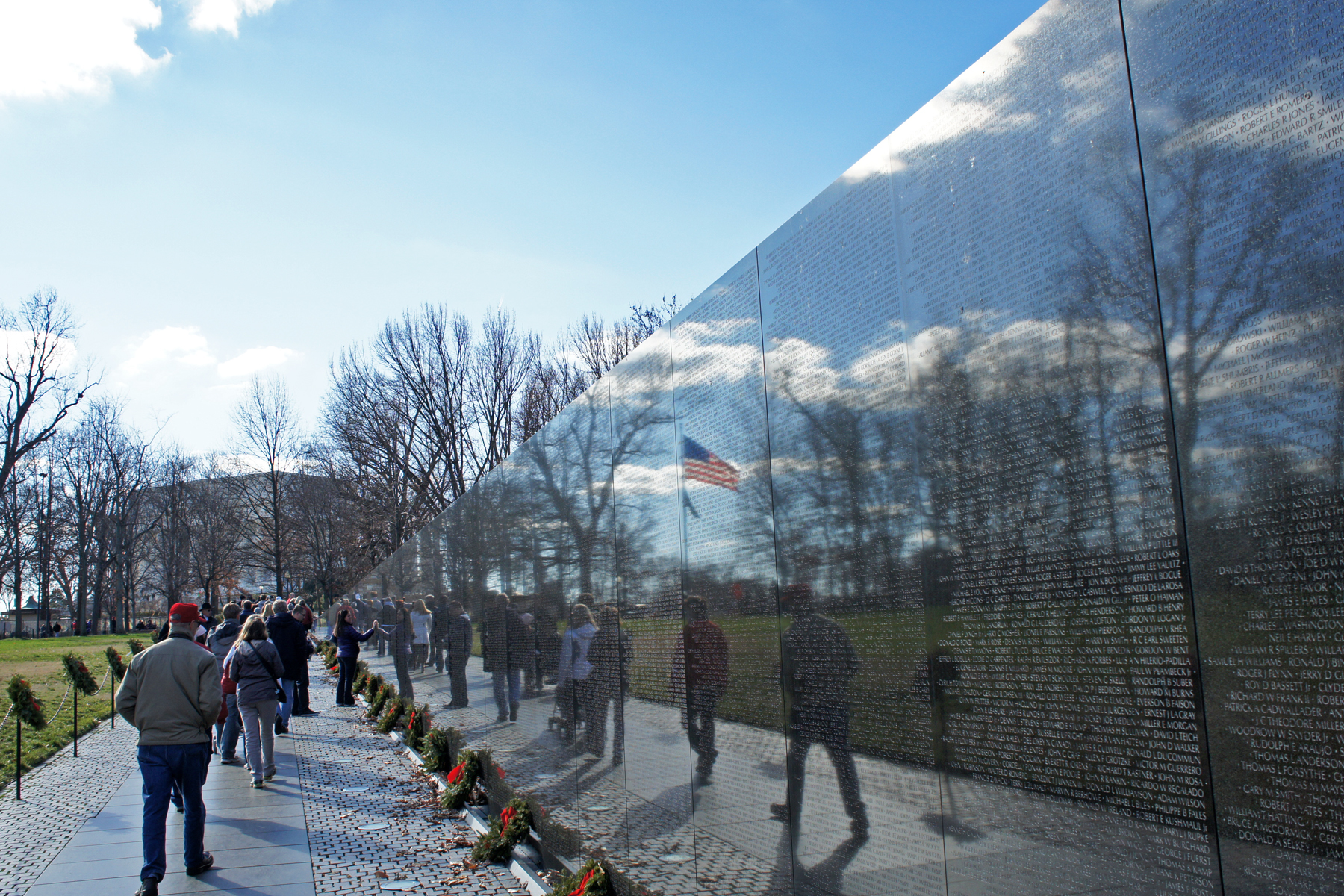
Vietnam Veterans Memorial Wall with American flag

More than 300 languages nationwide, and up to 800 languages in New York City, besides English, have native speakers in the United States—some are spoken by indigenous peoples (about 150 living languages) and others imported by immigrants. English is not the first language of most immigrants in the US, though many do arrive knowing how to speak it, especially from countries where English is broadly used. This not only includes immigrants from countries such as Canada, Jamaica, and the UK, where English is the primary language, but also countries where English is an official language, such as India, Nigeria, and the Philippines.

According to the 2000 census, there were nearly 30 million native speakers of Spanish in the United States. Spanish has official status in the Commonwealth of Puerto Rico, where it is the primary language spoken, and the state of New Mexico; numerous Spanish enclaves exist around the country as well.

Languages spoken at home in the United States, 2017
Language	Percentage of the total population
English only	78.2%
Spanish	13.4%
Chinese	1.1%
Other	7.3%

== Customs and traditions ==
=== Cuisine ===
Iconic American dishes such as apple pie, donuts, Southern fried chicken, American pizza, hamburgers, and hot dogs derive from the recipes of various immigrants and domestic innovations. French fries, Mexican dishes such as burritos and tacos, and pasta dishes freely adapted from Italian sources are consumed.

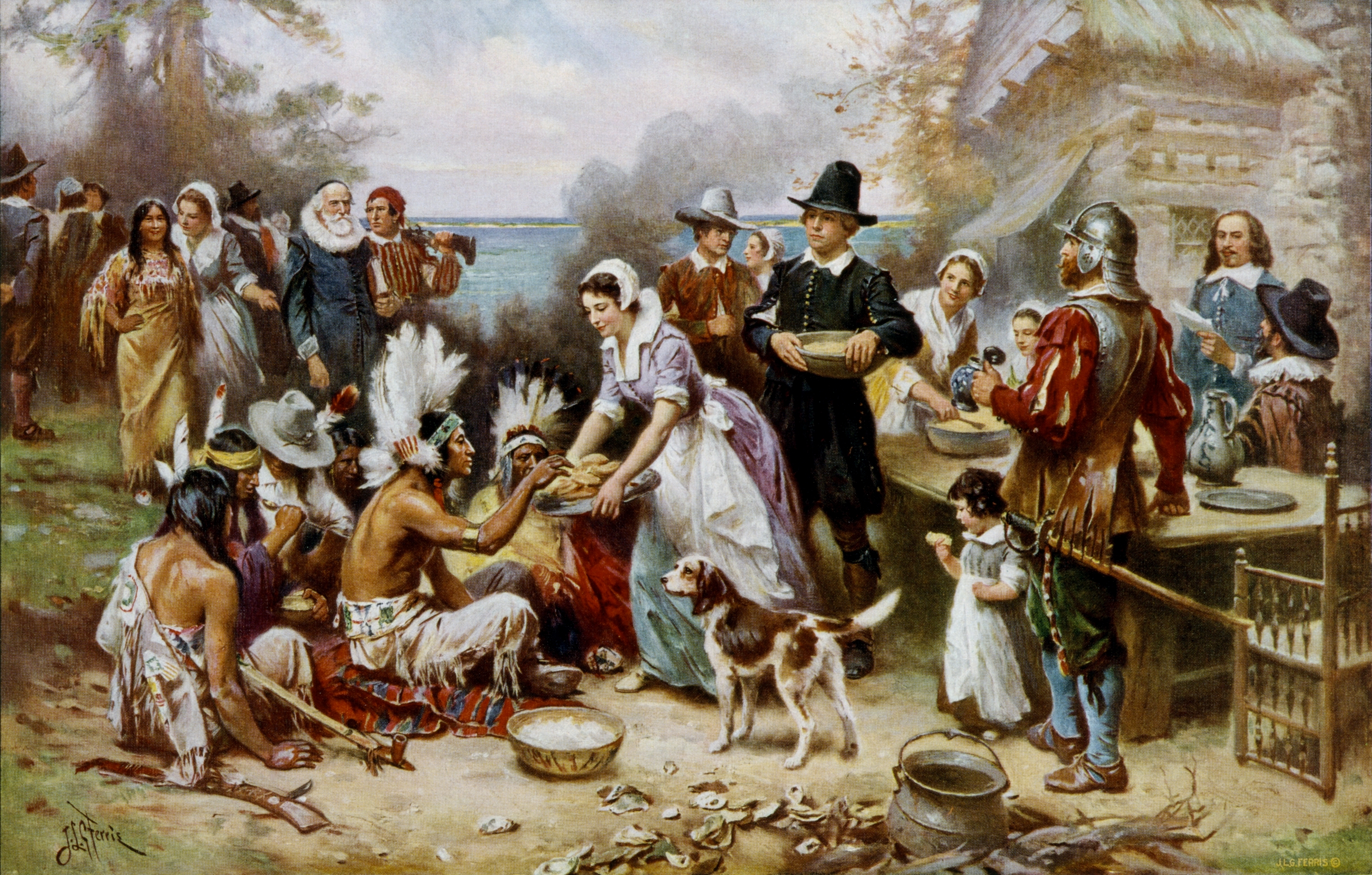
The First Thanksgiving 1621, oil-on-canvas by Jean Leon Gerome Ferris (1899)

The types of food served at home vary greatly and depend upon the region of the country and the family's own cultural heritage. Recent immigrants tend to eat food similar to that of their country of origin, and Americanized versions of these cultural foods, such as Chinese American cuisine or Italian American cuisine often eventually appear. Vietnamese cuisine, Korean cuisine, and Thai cuisine in authentic forms are often readily available in large cities. German cuisine has a profound impact on American cuisine, especially Midwestern cuisine; potatoes, noodles, roasts, stews, cakes, and other pastries are the most iconic ingredients in both cuisines. Dishes such as the hamburger, pot roast, baked ham, and hot dogs are examples of American dishes derived from German cuisine.

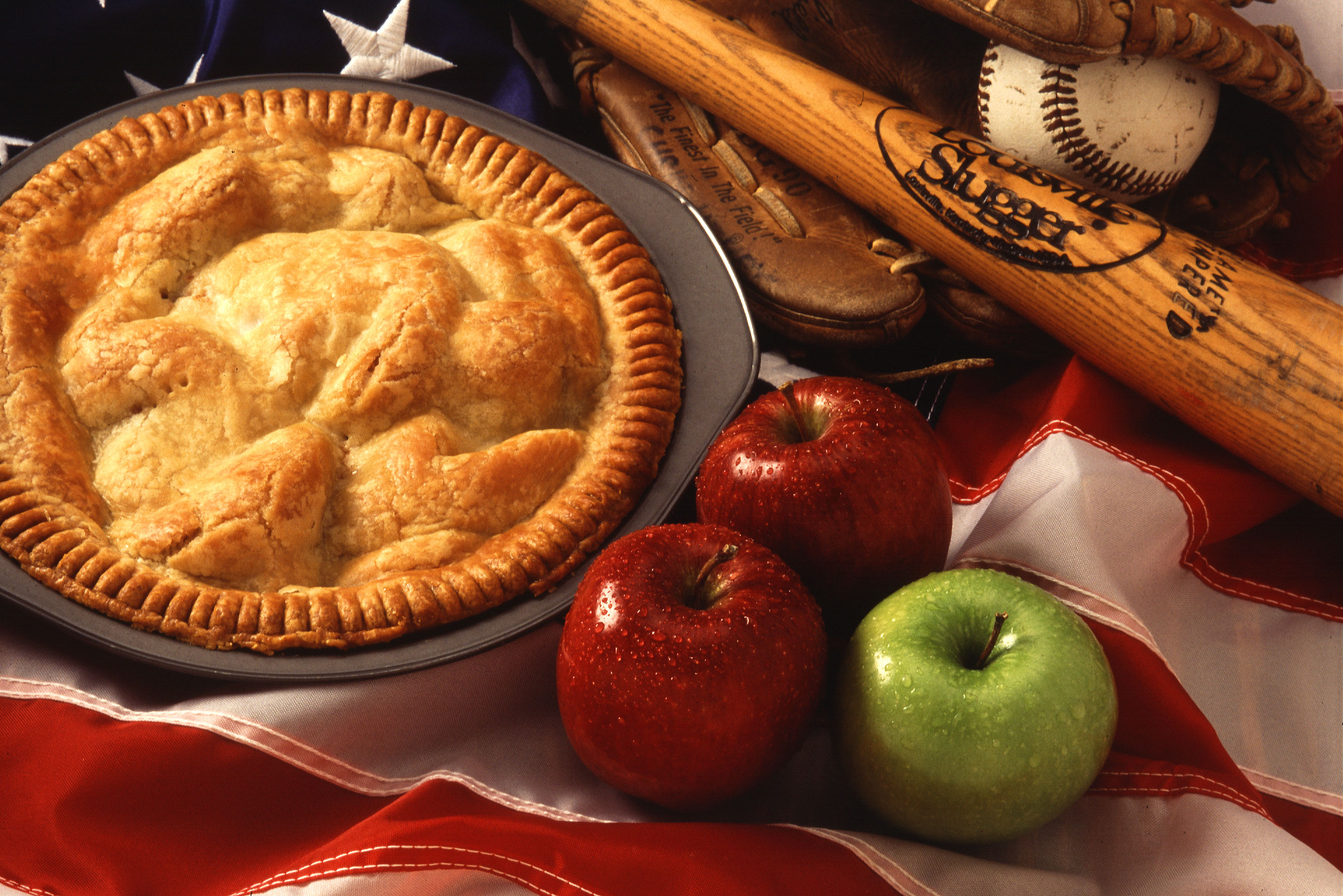
Apple pie is one of a number of American cultural icons.

Americans generally prefer coffee over tea, and more than half the adult population drinks at least one cup of coffee per day. Marketing by U.S. industries is largely responsible for making orange juice and milk (now often fat-reduced) ubiquitous breakfast beverages. During the 1980s and 1990s, the caloric intake of Americans rose by 24%; and frequent dining at fast food outlets is associated with what health officials call the American "obesity epidemic". Highly sweetened soft drinks are popular; sugared beverages account for 9% of the average American's daily caloric intake.

The American fast food industry, the world's first and largest, is also often viewed as being a symbol of U.S. marketing dominance. Companies such as McDonald's, Burger King, Pizza Hut, Kentucky Fried Chicken, and Domino's Pizza among others, have numerous outlets around the world, and pioneered the drive-through format in the 1940s.

Some representative American foods

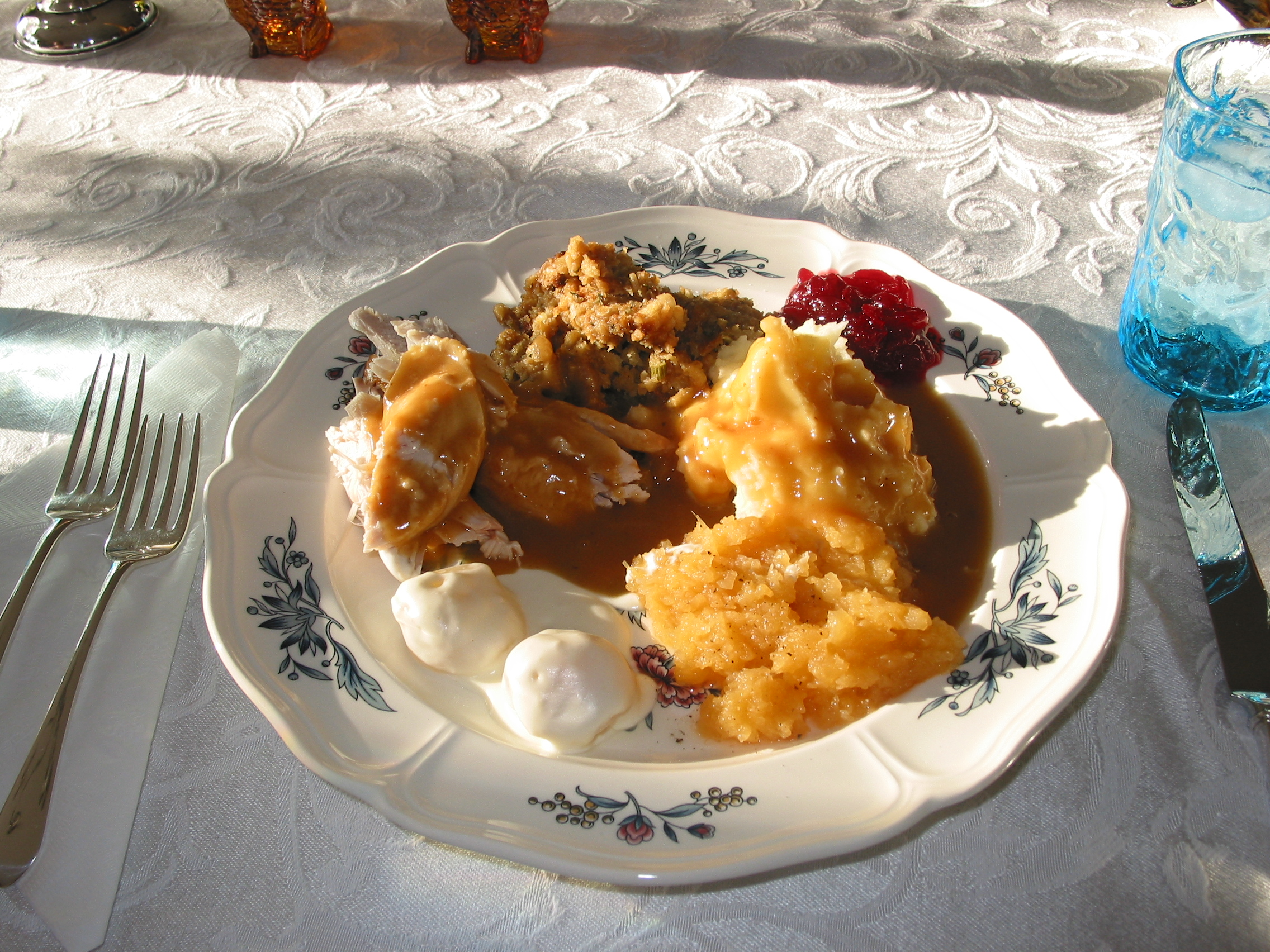
Traditional Thanksgiving dinner with turkey, dressing, sweet potatoes, and cranberry sauce

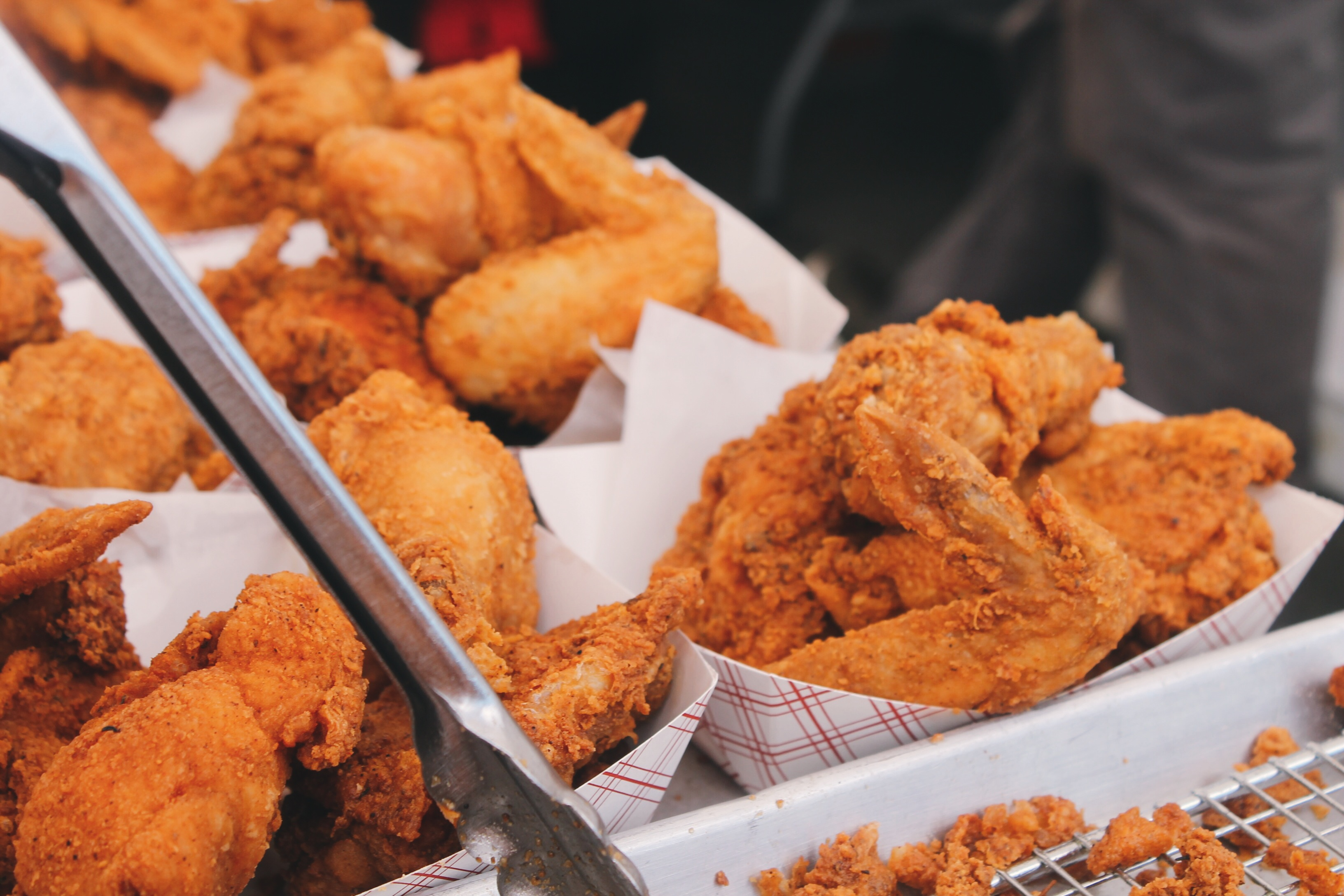
Fried chicken, a southern dish consisting of chicken pieces that have been coated with seasoned flour or batter and deep fried

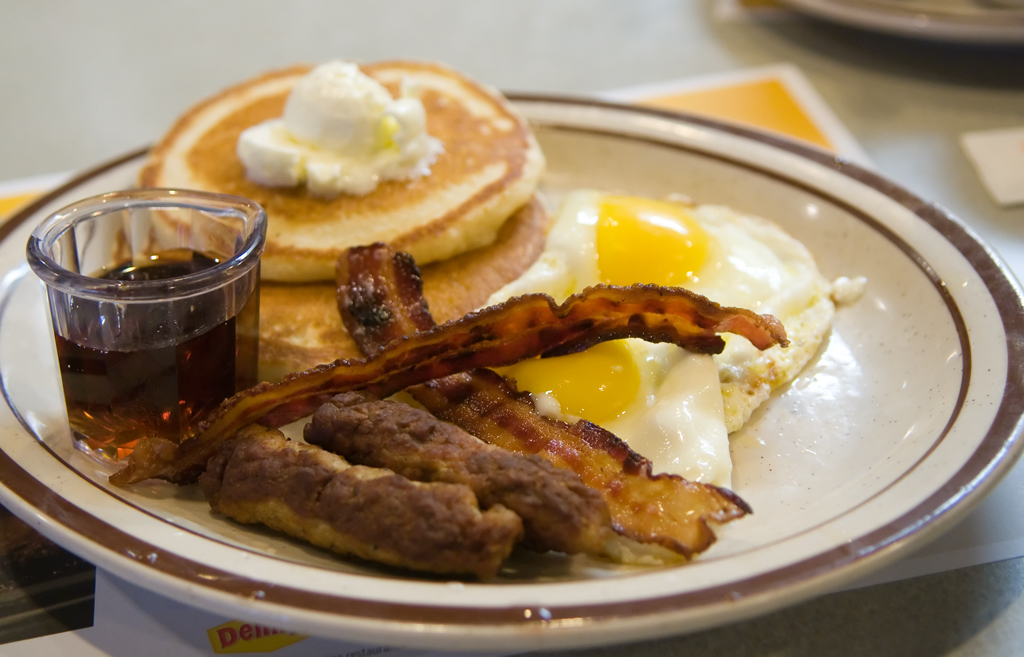
American style breakfast with pancakes, maple syrup, sausage links, bacon strips, and fried eggs

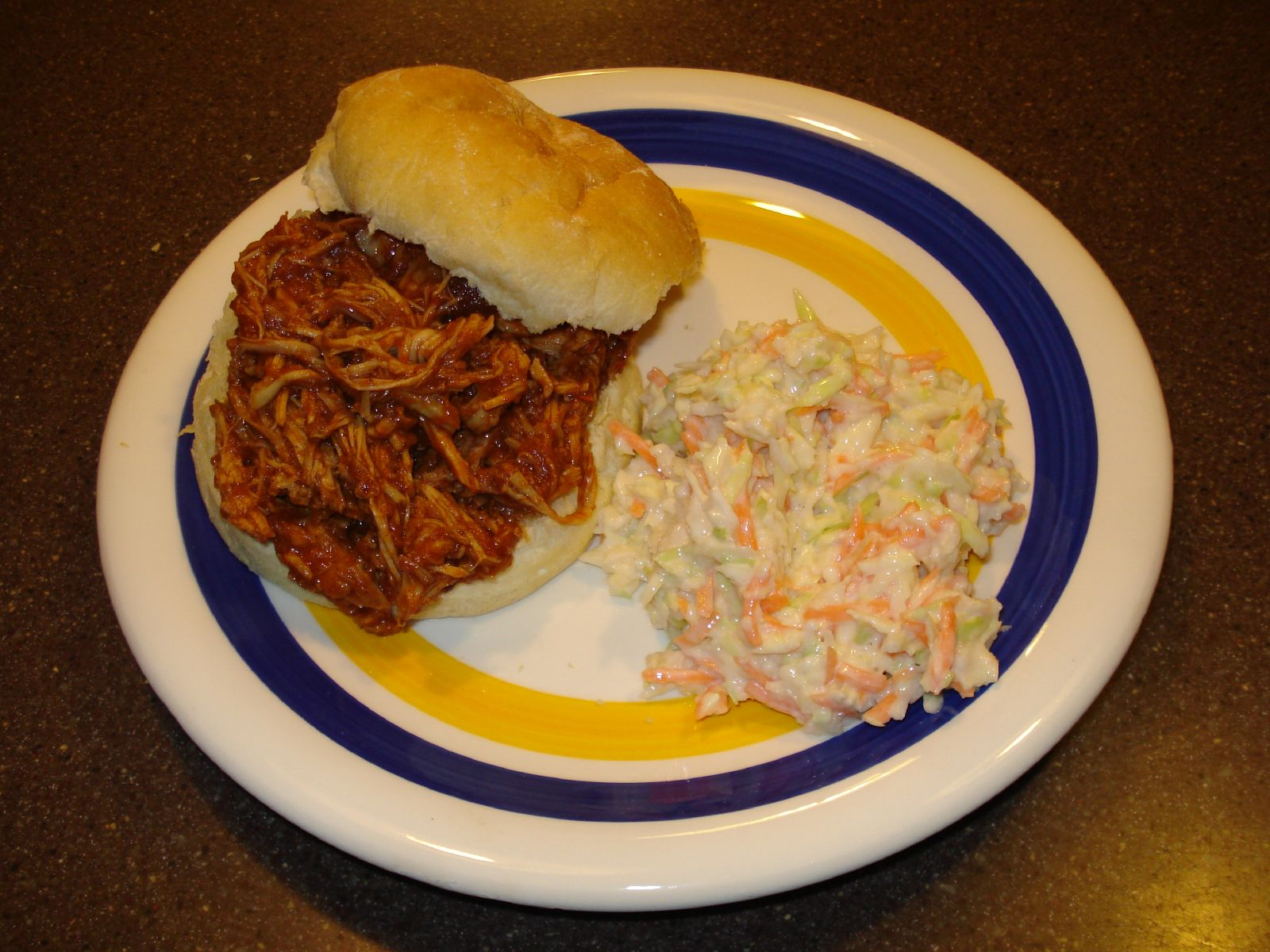
A barbecue pulled-pork sandwich with a side of coleslaw

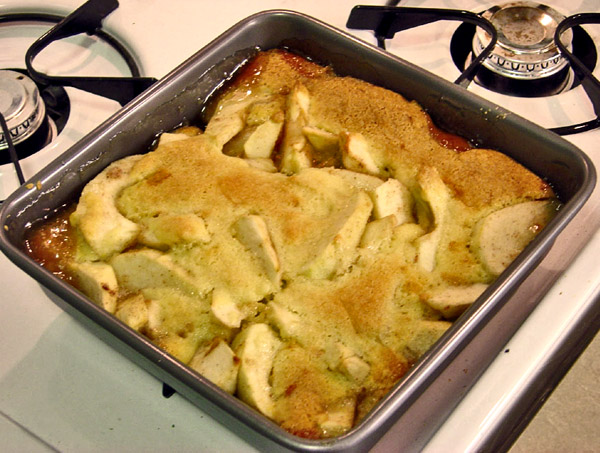
An apple cobbler dessert

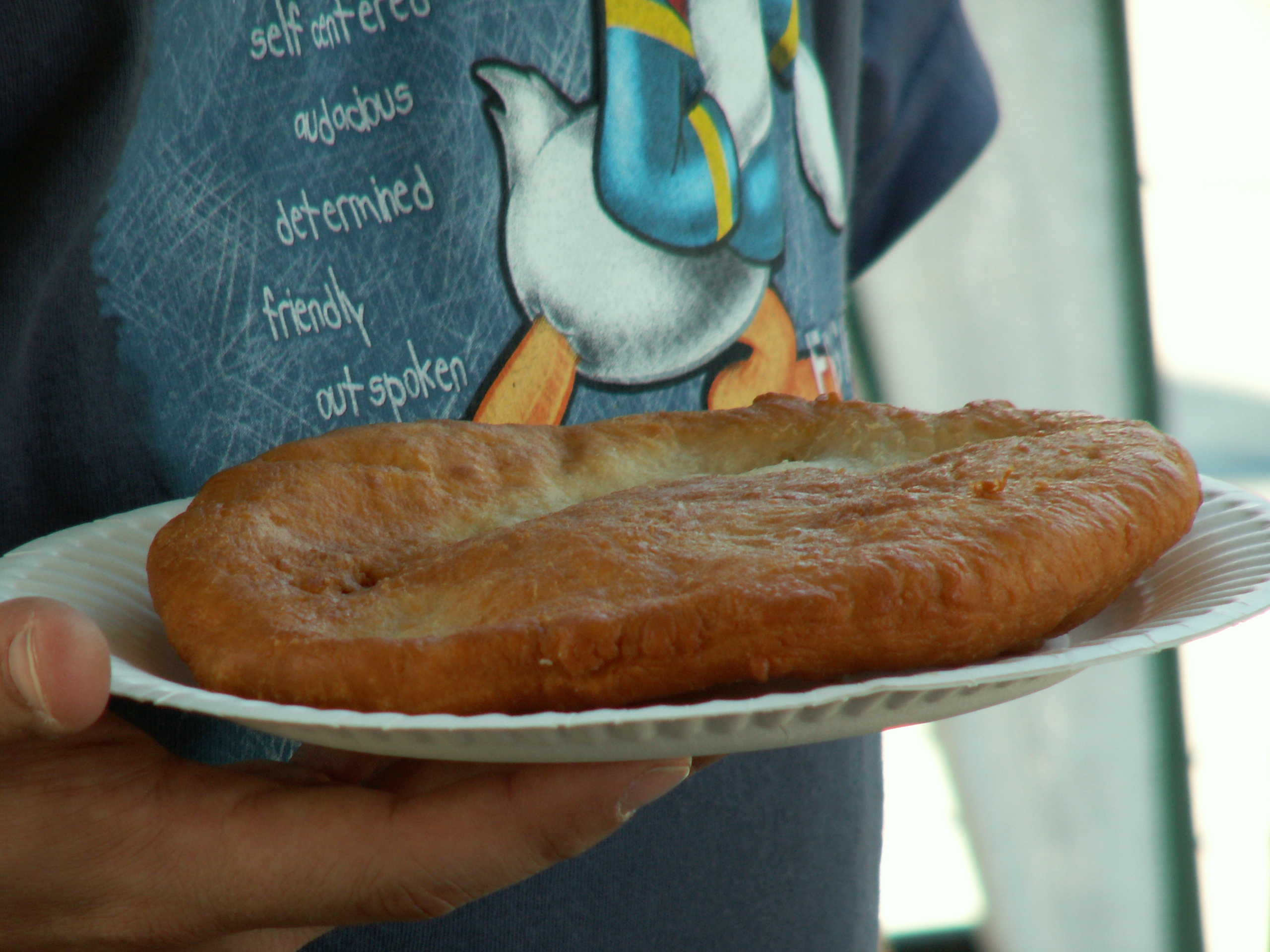
Frybread

=== Sports ===
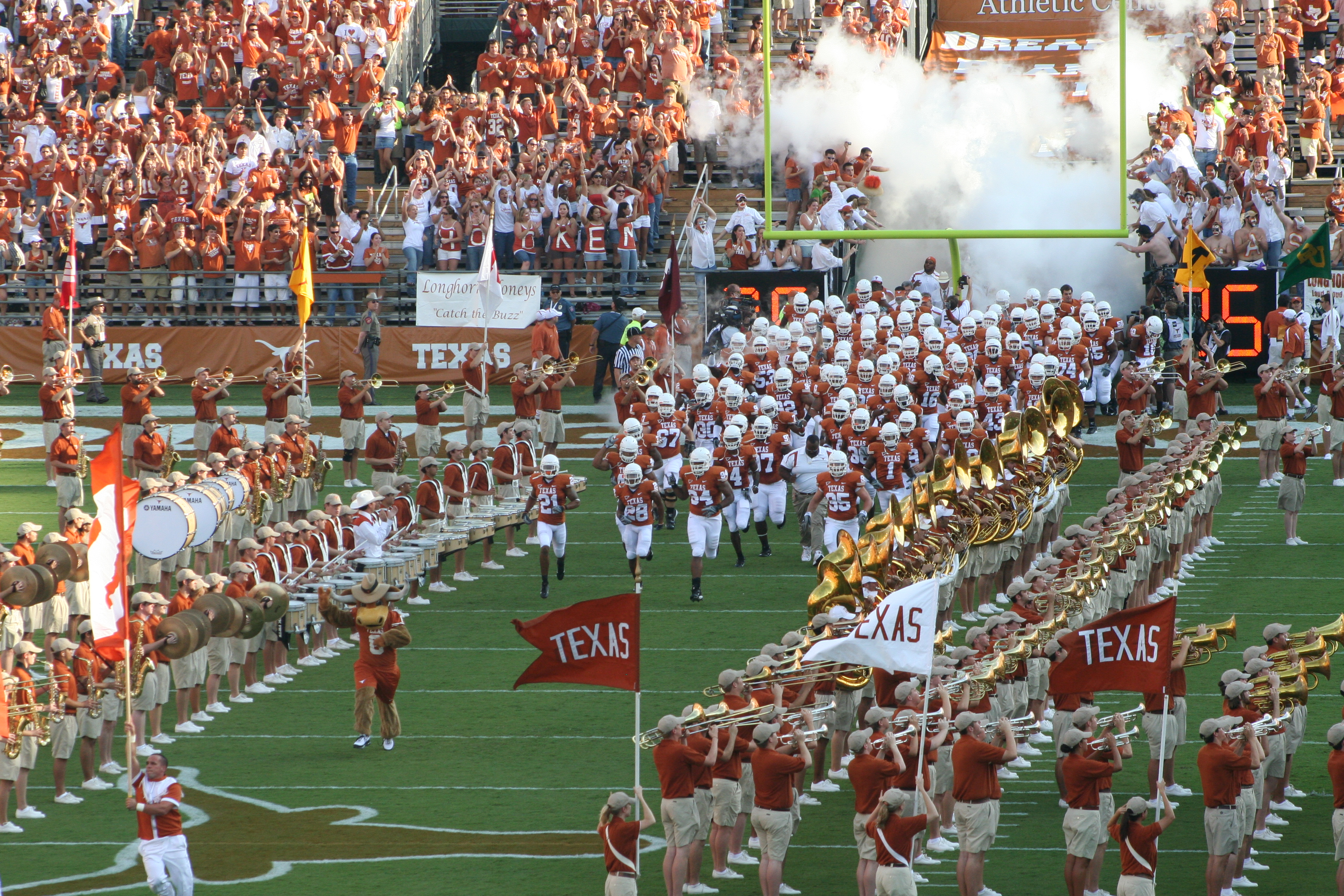
The opening of College football season is a major part of American pastime. Massive marching bands, cheerleaders, and colorguard are common at American football games.

In the 1800s, colleges were encouraged to focus on intramural sports, particularly track and field, and, in the late 1800s, American football. Physical education was incorporated into primary school curriculums in the 20th century.

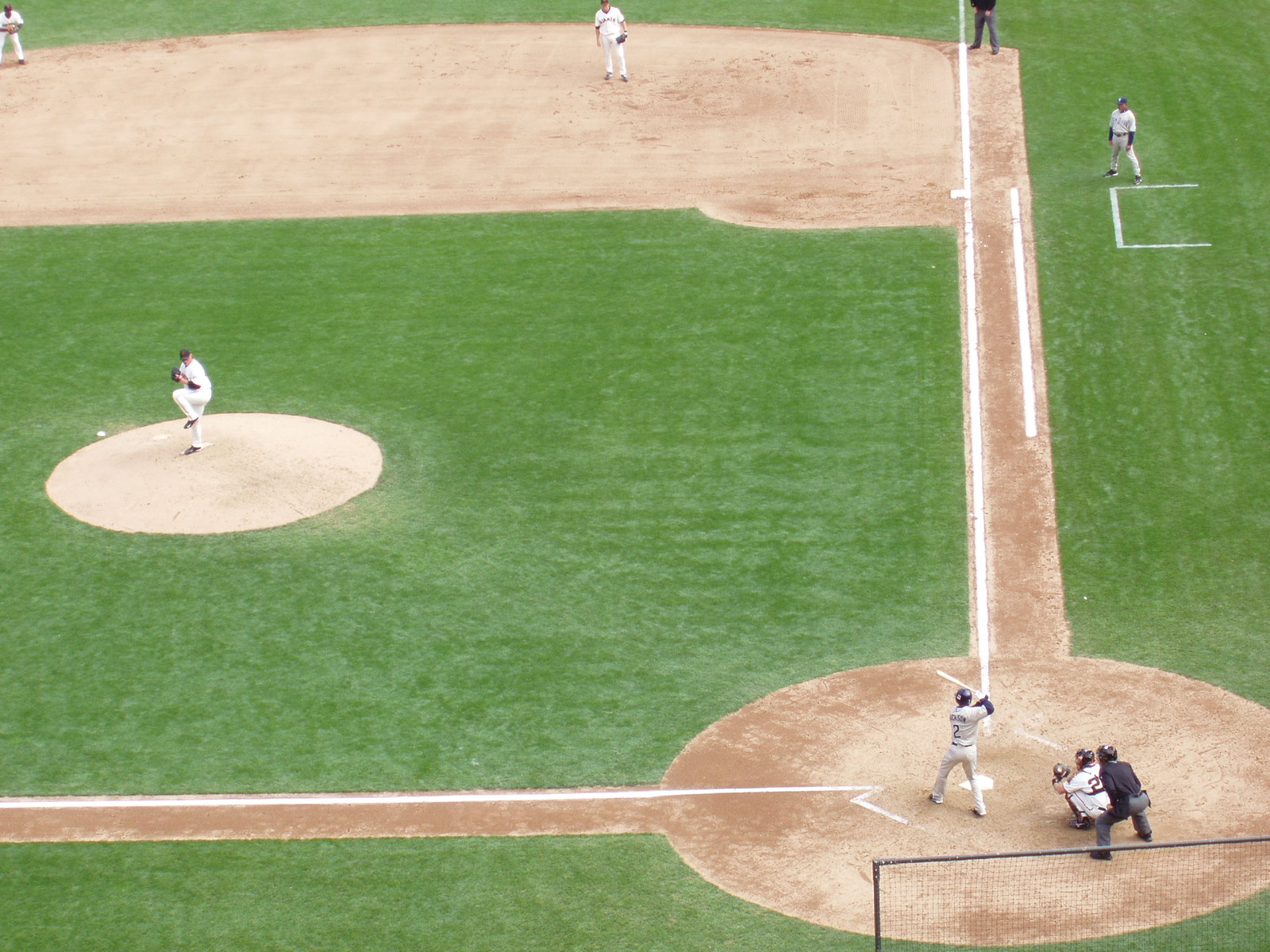
A typical baseball diamond as seen from the stadium

Baseball is the oldest of the major American team sports. Professional baseball dates from 1869 and had no close rivals in popularity until the 1960s. Though baseball is no longer the most popular sport, it is still referred to as "the national pastime".

Ice hockey is the fourth-leading professional team sport. Always a mainstay of Great Lakes and New England-area culture, the sport gained tenuous footholds in regions like the American South since the early 1990s, as the National Hockey League pursued a policy of expansion.

Soccer is very popular as a participation sport, particularly among youth, and the US national teams are competitive internationally. A thirty-team professional league, Major League Soccer, plays from March to October, but its television audience and overall popularity lag behind other American professional sports.

Relative to other parts of the world, the United States is unusually competitive in women's sports, a fact usually attributed to the Title IX anti-discrimination law, which requires most American colleges to give equal funding to men's and women's sports.

=== Public holidays ===
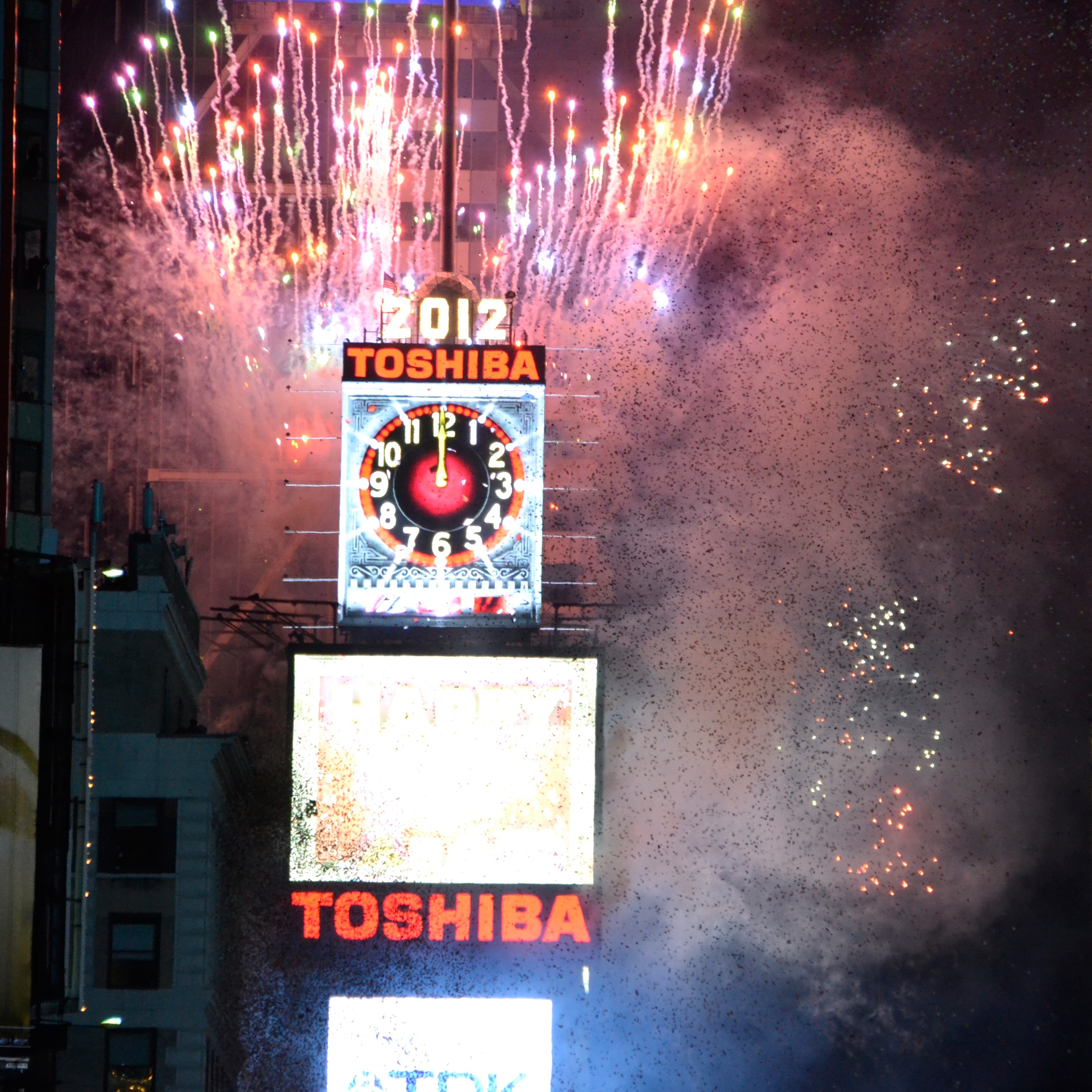
Times Square in Midtown Manhattan is the world's most famous location for New Year's celebrations, with the annual ball drop.

The United States observes holidays derived from events in American history, Christian traditions, and national patriarchs.

Federally recognized holidays of the United States
Date	Official name	Remarks
January 1	New Year's Day	Celebrates beginning of the Gregorian calendar year. Festivities include counting down to midnight (12:00 am) on a preceding night, New Year's Eve. The traditional end of the holiday season.
Third Monday of January	Birthday of Martin Luther King Jr., or Martin Luther King Jr. Day	Honors Martin Luther King Jr., Civil Rights leader, who was actually born on January 15, 1929; combined with other holidays in several states.
Third Monday of February	Washington's Birthday	Washington's Birthday was first declared a federal holiday by an 1879 act of Congress. The Uniform Holidays Act, 1968, shifted the date of the commemoration of Washington's Birthday from February 22 to the third Monday in February. Though its formal name was never changed, many call it "Presidents' Day" and consider it a day honoring all American presidents.
Last Monday of May	Memorial Day	Honors the nation's war dead from the Civil War onwards; marks the unofficial beginning of the summer season. (Previously May 30, shifted by the Uniform Holidays Act.)
June 19	Juneteenth	Juneteenth honors the emancipation of enslaved African Americans in the United States. An informal graft of the words "June" and "nineteenth", it refers to June 19, 1865, the final enforcement of President Lincoln's Emancipation Proclamation in distant Texas, which received belated news of it.
July 4	Independence Day	Celebrates Declaration of Independence, also called the Fourth of July.
First Monday of September	Labor Day	Celebrates the achievements of workers and the labor movement; marks the unofficial end of the summer season.
Second Monday of October	Columbus Day	Honors Christopher Columbus, traditional discoverer of the Americas. In some areas it is also a celebration of Italian culture and heritage. It is celebrated as American Indian Heritage Day and Fraternal Day in Alabama; celebrated as Native American Day in South Dakota. In Hawaii, it is celebrated as Discoverer's Day, though is not an official state holiday.
November 11	Veterans Day	Honors all veterans of the United States armed forces. A traditional observation is a moment of silence at 11:00 am remembering those killed in WWI. (Commemorates the 1918 armistice, which began at "the eleventh hour of the eleventh day of the eleventh month".)
Fourth Thursday of November	Thanksgiving Day	Traditionally celebrates the giving of thanks for the autumn harvest. Traditionally includes the consumption of a turkey dinner, and starts the holiday season.
December 25	Christmas	Celebrates the Nativity of Jesus.

=== Names ===
Creativity has also long been a part of American naming traditions and names have been used to express personality, cultural identity, and values. Naming trends vary by race, geographic area, and socioeconomic status. African Americans, for instance, have developed a very distinct naming culture. Both religious names and those inspired by popular culture are common.

=== Fashion and dress ===
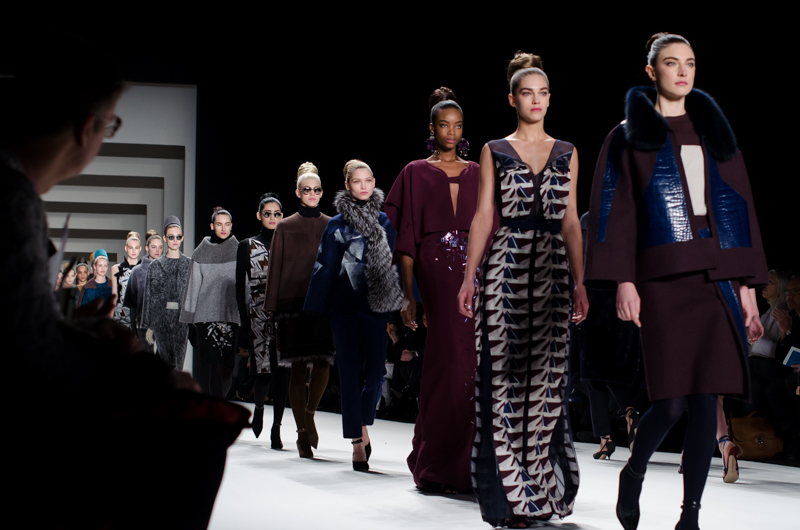
Haute couture fashion models on the catwalk during New York Fashion Week

Blue jeans were popularized as work clothes in the 1850s by merchant Levi Strauss, a German-Jewish immigrant in San Francisco, and adopted by many American teenagers a century later. They are worn in every state by people of all ages and social classes. Along with mass-marketed informal wear in general, blue jeans are arguably one of US culture's primary contributions to global fashion.

The annual Met Gala in Manhattan is known worldwide as "fashion's biggest night".

=== The nuclear family and family structure ===
Family arrangements in the United States reflect the nature of contemporary American society. The classic nuclear family is a man and a woman, united in marriage, with one or more biological children. Today, a person may grow up in a single-parent family, go on to marry and live in a childfree couple arrangement, then get divorced, live as a single for a couple of years, remarry, have children and live in a nuclear family arrangement.

Year	Families (69.7%)				Non-families (31.2%)		
Year	Married couples (52.5%)		Single parents	Other blood relatives	Singles (25.5%)		Other non-family
Year	Nuclear family	Without children	Single parents	Other blood relatives	Male	Female	Other non-family
2000	24.1%	28.7%	9.9%	7%	10.7%	14.8%	5.7%
1970	40.3%	30.3%	5.2%	5.5%	5.6%	11.5%	1.7%

=== Youth dependence ===
Exceptions to the longstanding American custom of leaving home when one reaches legal adulthood at age eighteen can occur especially among Italian and Hispanic Americans, and in expensive urban real estate markets such as New York City, California, and Honolulu.

=== Marriage and divorce ===
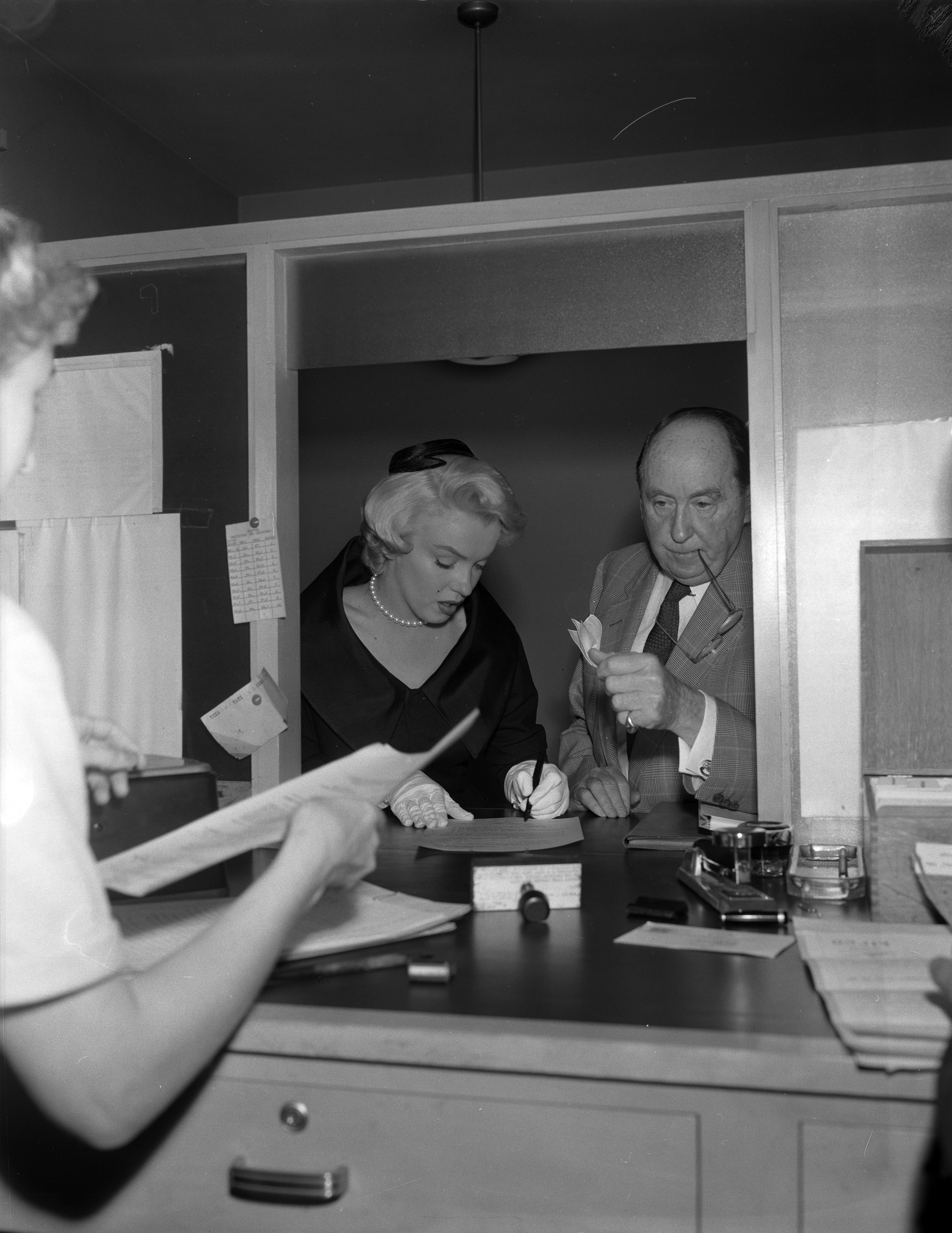
Marilyn Monroe signing divorce papers with celebrity attorney Jerry Giesler

State law provides for child support where children are involved, and sometimes for alimony. "Married adults now divorce two-and-a-half times as often as adults did 20 years ago and four times as often as they did 50 years ago... between 40% and 60% of new marriages will eventually end in divorce. The probability within... the first five years is 20%, and the probability of its ending within the first 10 years is 33%... Perhaps 25% of children (ages 16 and under) live with a stepparent."

=== Housing ===
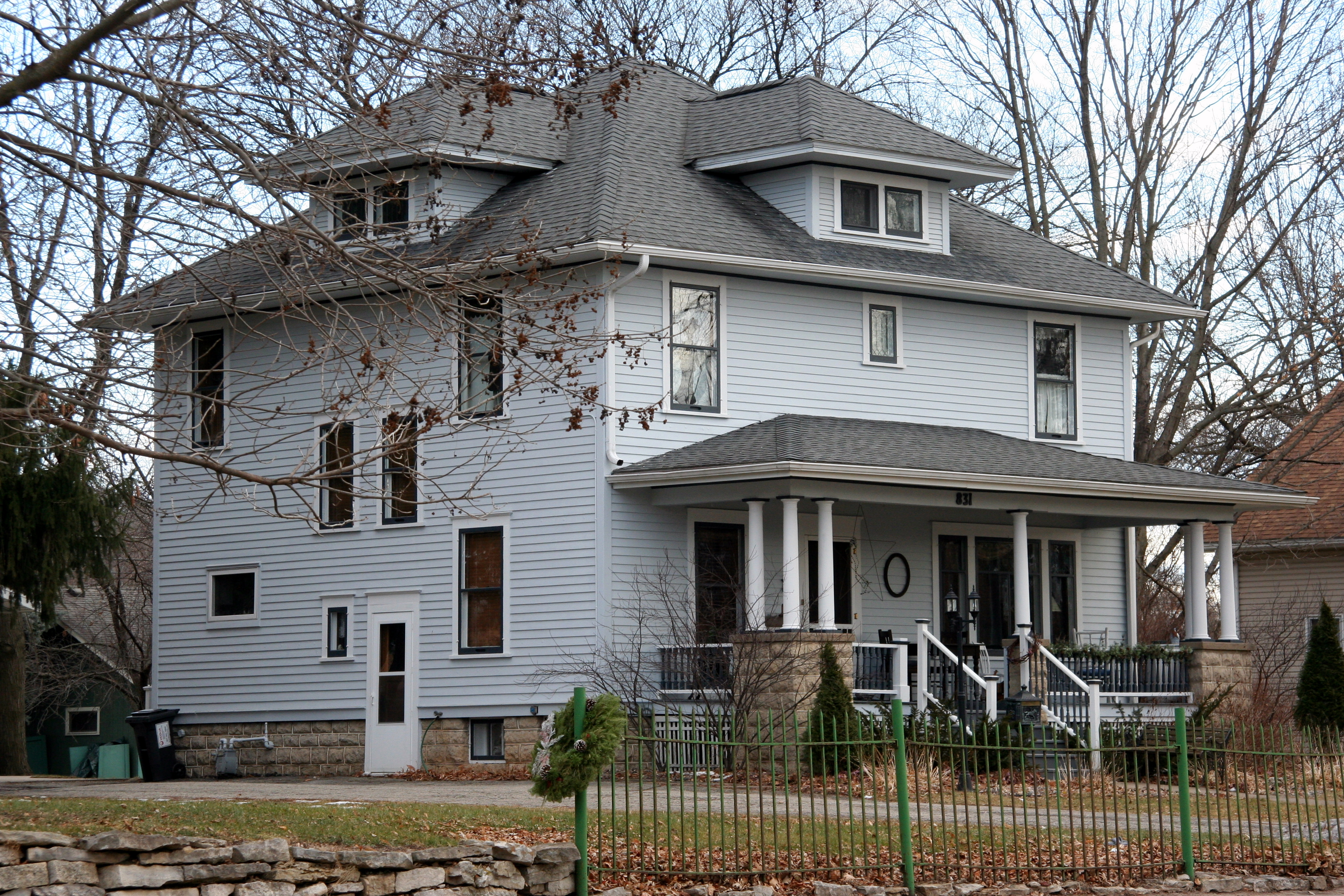
The American Foursquare was a popular house style from the late 19th century until the 1930s.

American cities with housing prices near the national median have also been losing the middle income neighborhoods, those with median income between 80% and 120% of the metropolitan area's median household income. Here, the more affluent members of the middle-class, who are also often referred to as being professional or upper-middle-class, have left in search of larger homes in more exclusive suburbs. This trend is largely attributed to the middle-class squeeze, which has caused a starker distinction between the statistical middle class and the more privileged members of the middle class. In more expensive areas such as California, however, another trend has been taking place where an influx of more affluent middle-class households has displaced those in the actual middle of society and converted former American middle-middle-class neighborhoods into upper-middle-class neighborhoods.

=== Volunteerism ===
Alexis de Tocqueville first noted, in 1835, the American attitude towards helping others in need. A 2011 Charities Aid Foundation study found that Americans were the first most willing to help a stranger and donate time and money in the world at 60%. Many low-level crimes are punished by assigning hours of "community service", a requirement that the offender perform volunteer work.

=== Drugs and alcohol ===
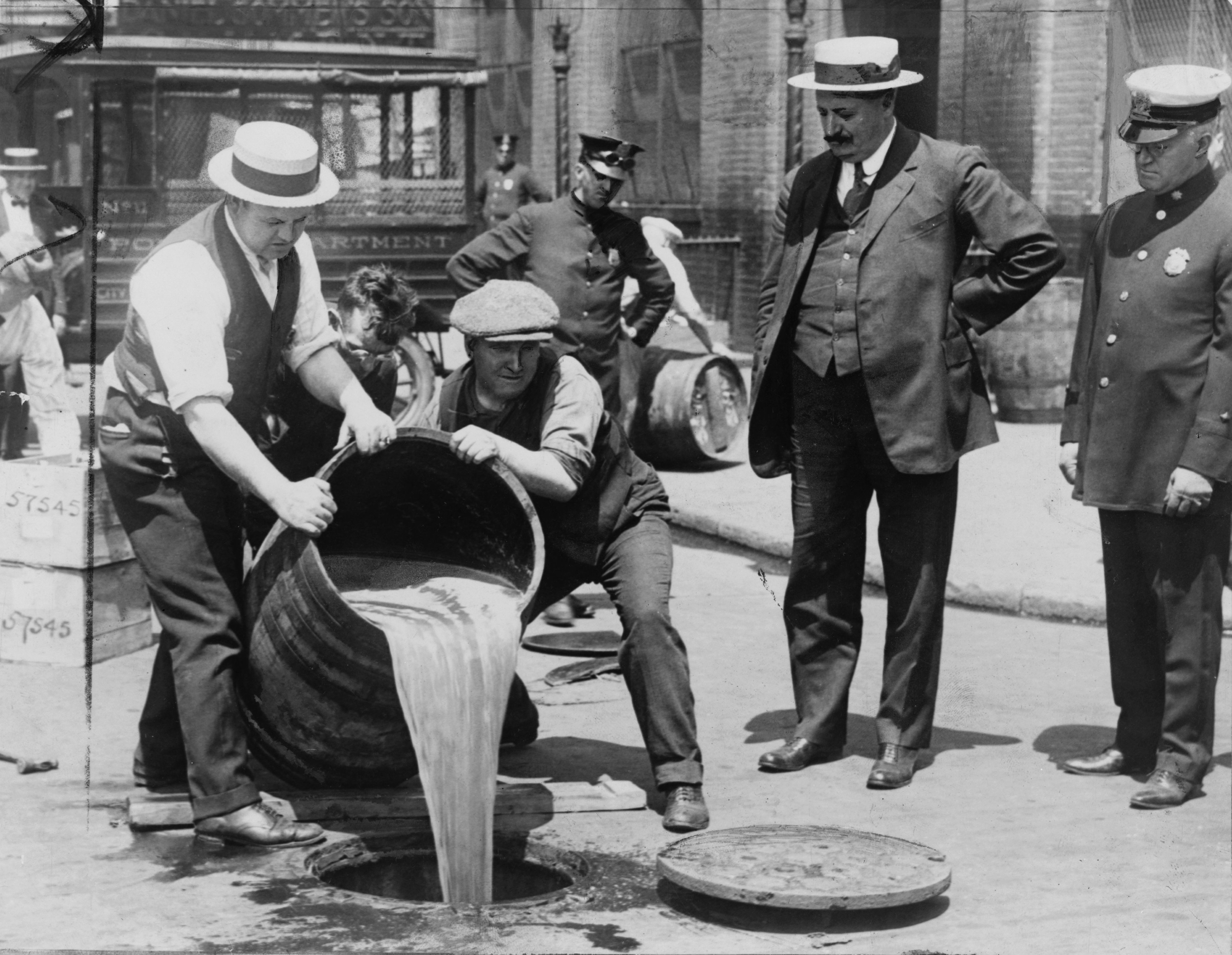
New York City Police officers pour liquor into sewer during Prohibition in 1921

American attitudes towards drugs and alcoholic beverages have evolved considerably throughout the country's history. In the 19th century, alcohol was readily available and consumed, and no laws restricted the use of other drugs. Attitudes on drug addiction started to change, resulting in the Harrison Act, which eventually became proscriptive.

A movement to ban alcoholic beverages called the Temperance movement, emerged in the late 19th century. Several American Protestant religious groups and women's groups, such as the Women's Christian Temperance Union, supported the movement. In 1919, Prohibitionists succeeded in amending the Constitution to prohibit the sale of alcohol. Although the Prohibition period did result in a 50% decrease in alcohol consumption, banning alcohol outright proved to be unworkable, as the previously legitimate distillery industry was replaced by criminal gangs that trafficked in alcohol.

A "Just Say No to Drugs" movement replaced the more liberal ethos of the 1960s. This led to stricter drug laws and greater police latitude in drug cases. Drugs are, however, widely available, and 16% of Americans 12 and older used an illicit drug in 2012.

== Arts ==
=== Architecture ===
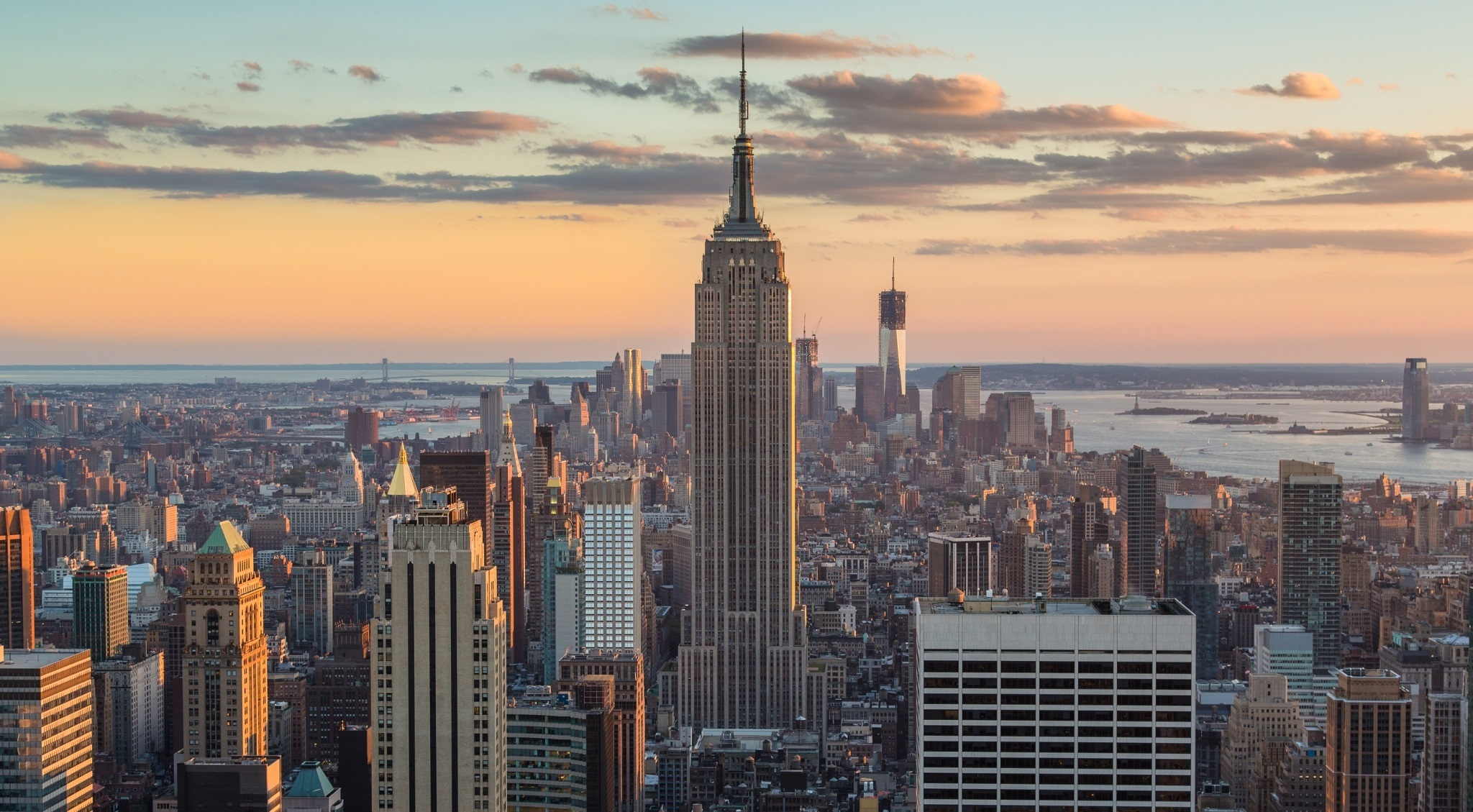
The current One World Trade Center in Lower Manhattan (background, seen under construction) surpassed the height of the Empire State Building in Midtown Manhattan (foreground) on April 30, 2012.

Architecture in the United States is regionally diverse and has been shaped by many external forces. U.S. architecture can therefore be said to be eclectic. Traditionally American architecture has influences from English architecture to Greco Roman architecture.

=== Theater and performing arts ===
Theater of the United States is based in the Western tradition. The United States originated stand-up comedy and modern improvisational theatre, which involves taking suggestions from the audience.

==== Minstrel show ====
The minstrel show, though now widely recognized as racist and offensive, is also recognized as the first uniquely American theatrical art form. Minstrel shows were developed in the 19th century and they were typically performed by white actors wearing blackface makeup for the purpose of imitating and caricaturing the speech and music of African Americans. Stephen Foster was a famous composer for minstrel shows. Many of his songs such as "Camptown Races", "Oh Susanna", and "My Old Kentucky Home" became popular American folk songs. Tap dancing and stand-up comedy have origins in minstrel shows.

Banjos, originally hand-made by slaves for entertainment on plantations, began to be mass-produced in the United States in the 1840s as a result of their extensive use on the minstrel stage.

==== Drama ====
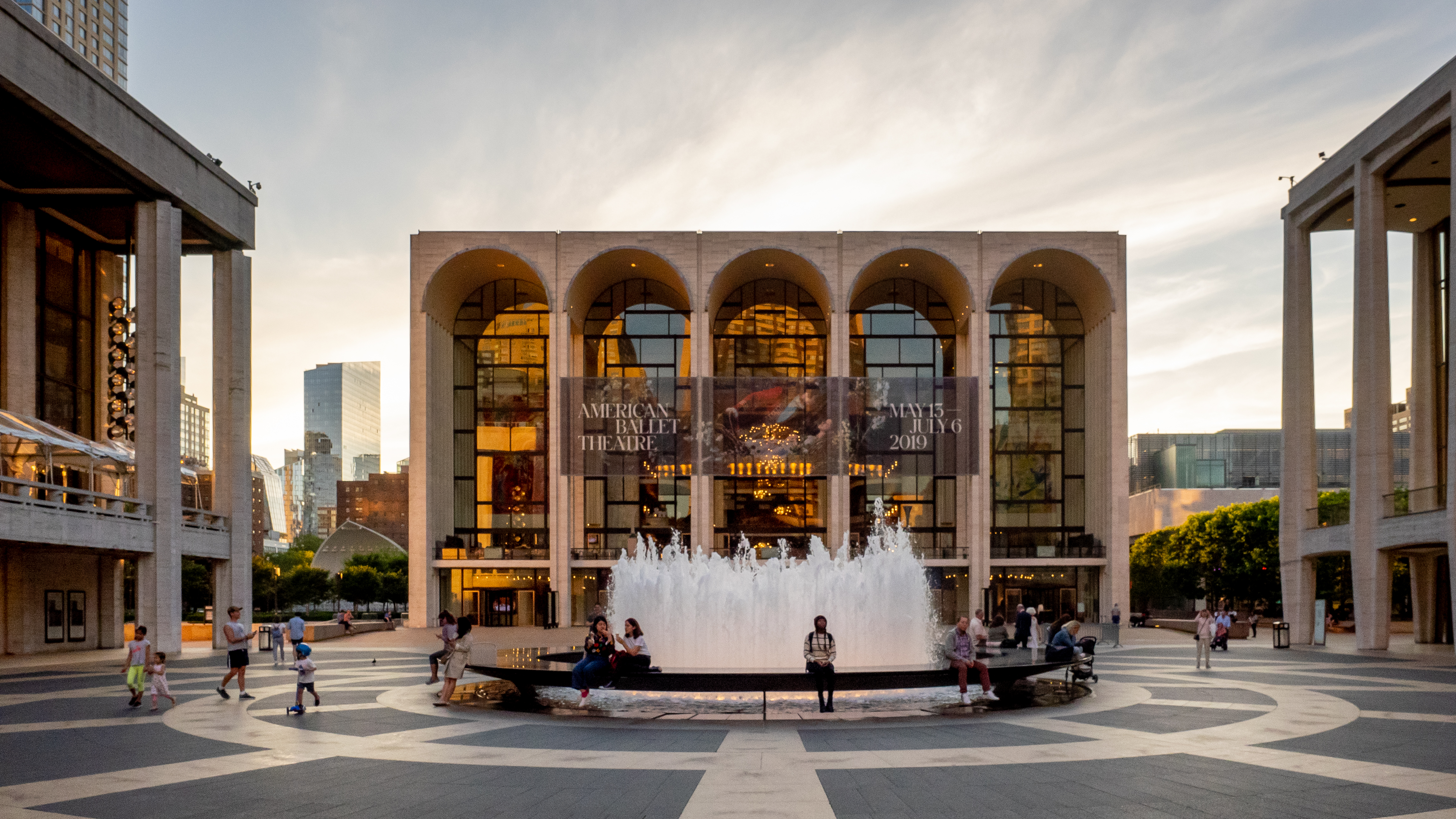
Lincoln Center, on the Upper West Side of Manhattan, hosts the David H. Koch Theater (left), the Metropolitan Opera House (center), and David Geffen Hall (right), surrounding the Revson Fountain.

Social commentary has also been a preoccupation of American theater, often addressing issues not discussed in the mainstream. Writers such as Lorraine Hansbury, August Wilson, David Mamet and Tony Kushner have all won Pulitzer Prizes for their polemical plays on American society.

=== Music ===
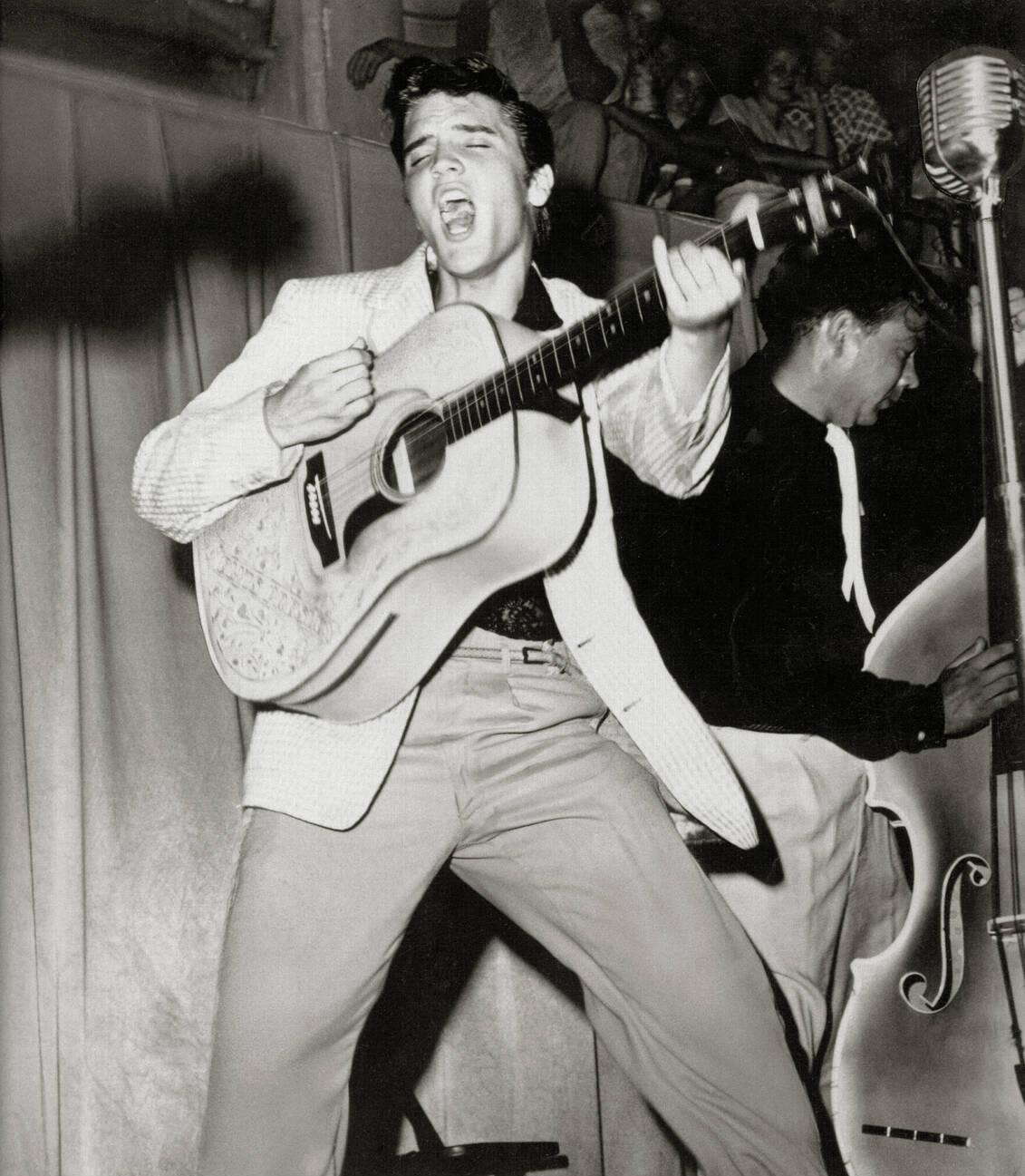
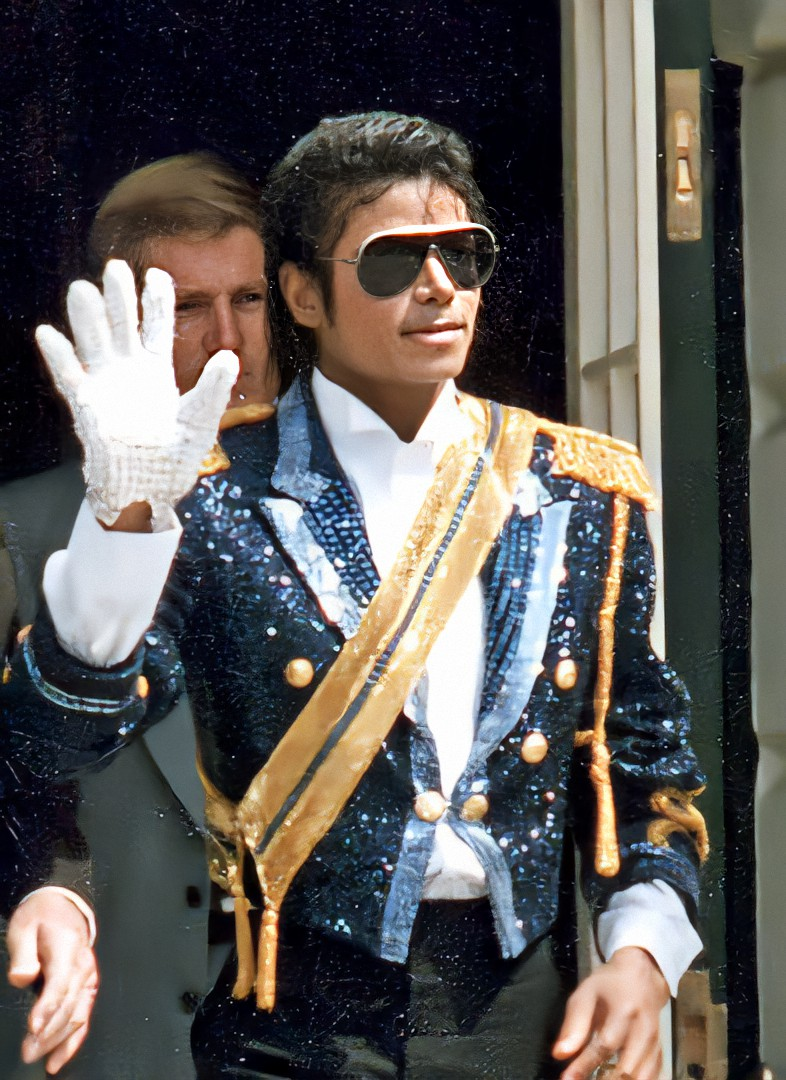
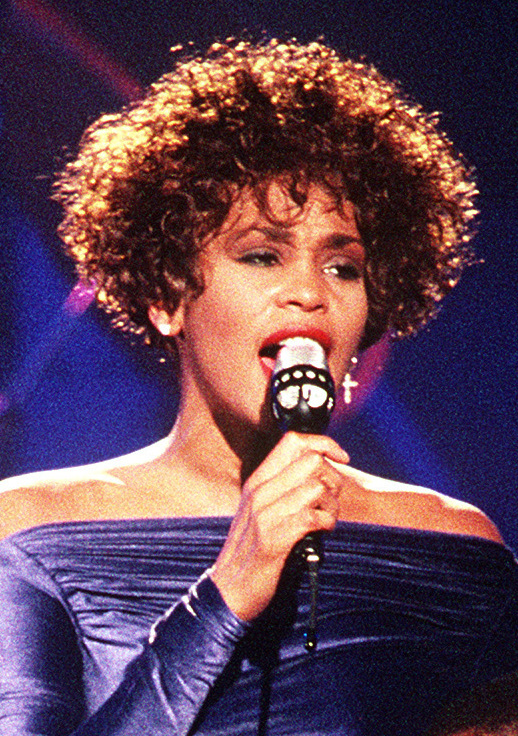
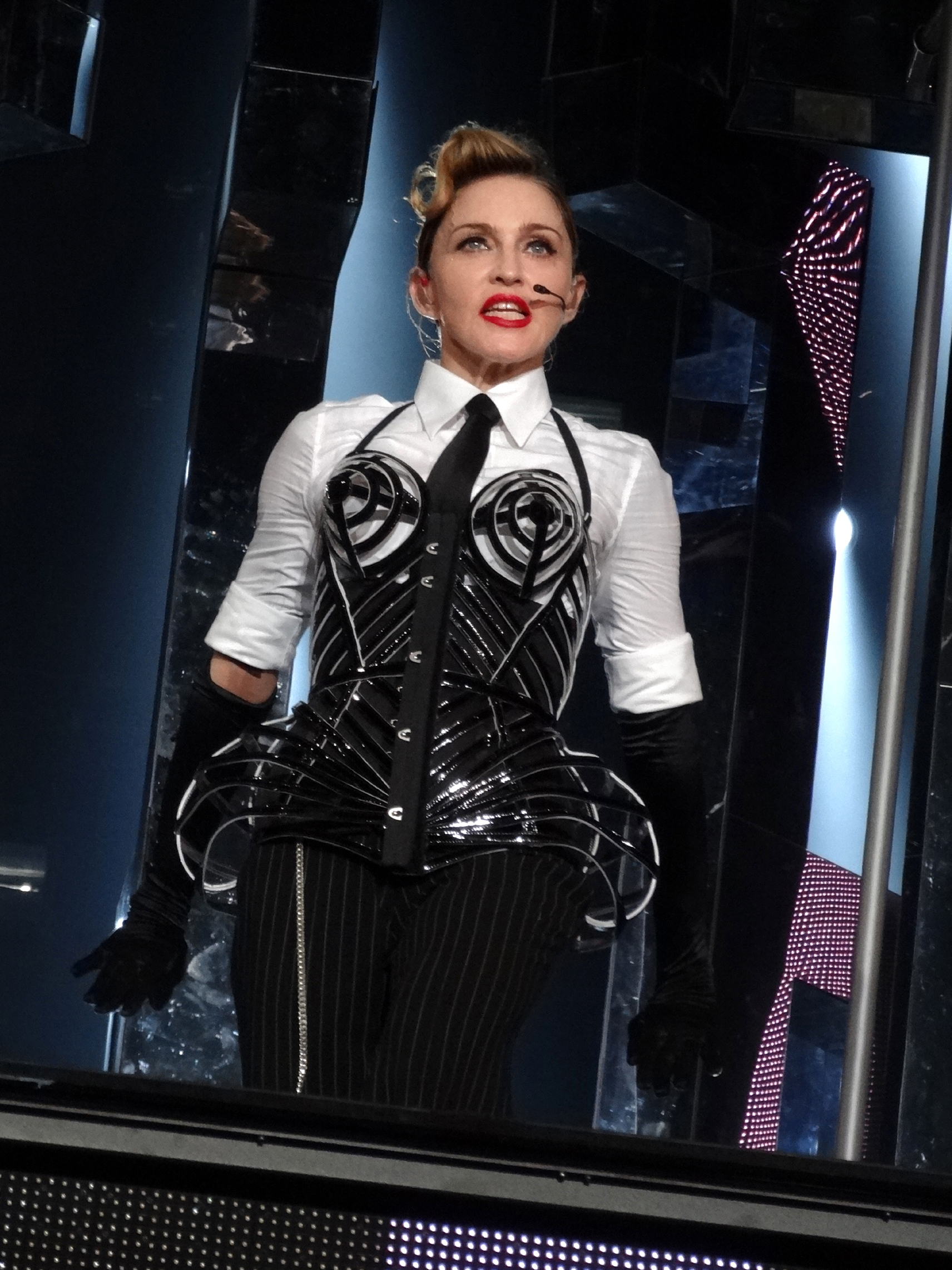
American music artists such as Elvis Presley, Michael Jackson, Whitney Houston, and Madonna have been considered global celebrities.

American music styles and influences (such as country, jazz, blues, rock, pop, techno, soul, and hip hop) and music based on them can be heard all over the world. Music in the U.S. is very diverse, and the country has the world's largest music market with a total retail value of $4.9 billion in 2014.

The rhythmic and lyrical styles of African-American music have significantly influenced American music at large, distinguishing it from European and African traditions. The Smithsonian Institution states, "African-American influences are so fundamental to American music that there would be no American music without them." Country music developed in the 1920s, and rhythm and blues in the 1940s. Elements from folk idioms such as the blues and what is known as old-time music were adopted and transformed into popular genres with global audiences. Jazz was developed by innovators such as Louis Armstrong and Duke Ellington early in the 20th century. Known for singing in a wide variety of genres, Aretha Franklin is considered one of the all-time greatest American singers.

Chuck Berry, Elvis Presley, and Little Richard were among the pioneers of rock and roll in the mid-1950s. Rock bands such as Metallica, the Eagles, and Aerosmith are among the highest grossing in worldwide sales. In the 1960s, Bob Dylan emerged from the folk revival to become one of America's most celebrated songwriters.

American popular music, as part of the wider U.S. pop culture, has a worldwide influence and following. Mid-20th-century American pop stars such as Bing Crosby, Frank Sinatra, and Elvis Presley became global celebrities, as have artists of the late 20th century such as Michael Jackson, Prince, Madonna, and Whitney Houston.

As of 2022, Taylor Swift, Miley Cyrus, Ariana Grande, Eminem, Lady Gaga, Katy Perry, and many others contemporary artists dominate global streaming rankings.

The annual Coachella music festival in California is one of the largest, most famous, and most profitable music festivals in the United States and the world.

=== Cinema ===
The Hollywood Sign

The United States movie industry has a worldwide influence and following. Hollywood, a northern district of Los Angeles, California, is the leader in motion picture production and the most recognizable movie industry in the world. The major film studios of the United States are the primary source of the most commercially successful and most ticket selling movies in the world.

The dominant style of American cinema is classical Hollywood cinema, which developed from 1913 to 1969 and is still typical of most films made there to this day. While Frenchmen Auguste and Louis Lumière are generally credited with the birth of modern cinema, American cinema soon came to be a dominant force in the emerging industry. The world's first sync-sound musical film, The Jazz Singer, was released in 1927. Orson Welles's Citizen Kane (1941) is frequently cited in critics' polls as the greatest film of all time. Gone with the Wind, directed by David O. Selznick and based upon the book by Margaret Mitchell, has repeatedly been identified in polls as Americans' favorite film or as the best American film; adjusted for inflation, it is the highest-grossing film of all time.

=== Broadcasting ===
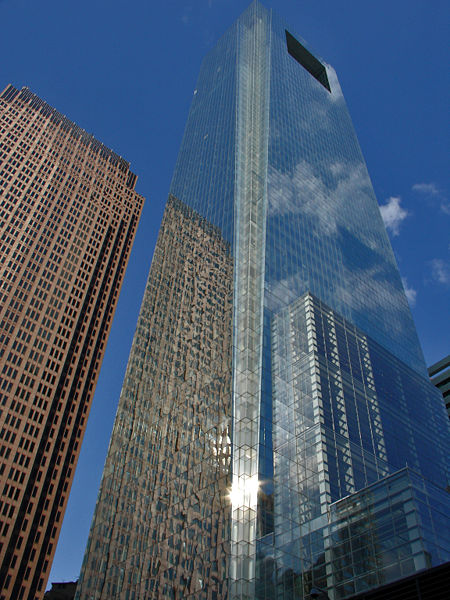
Comcast Center in Philadelphia, headquarters of Comcast, the world's largest telecommunications and media conglomerate

Television constitutes a significant part of the traditional media of the United States. Household ownership of television sets in the country is 96.7%, and the majority of households have more than one set. The peak ownership percentage of households with at least one television set occurred during the 1996–97 season, with 98.4% ownership. As a whole, the television networks of the United States is the largest and most syndicated in the world.

In August 2013, approximately 114,200,000 American households owned at least one television set. In the 2010s, due to a surge in the number and popularity of critically acclaimed television series, many critics said that American television was enjoying a second golden age.

=== Philosophy ===
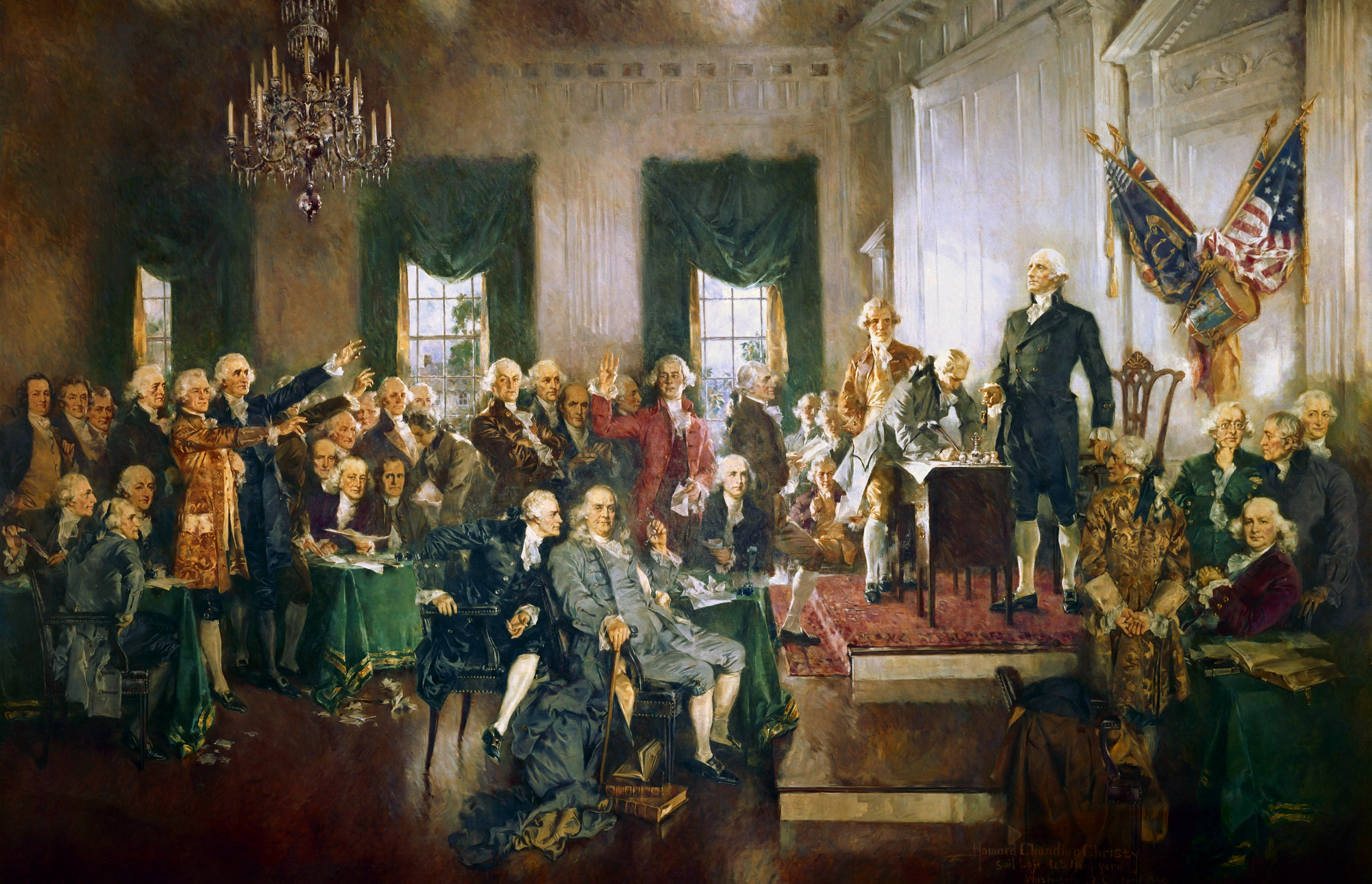
Painting by Howard Chandler Christy of the scene at the Philadelphia Convention which led to the signing of the United States Constitution, an important document in American political and legal philosophy

Early American philosophy was heavily shaped by the European Age of Enlightenment, which promoted ideals such as reason and individual liberty.

Artificial intelligence and the philosophy of mind have been heavily influenced by American philosophers such as Daniel Dennett, Noam Chomsky, Hilary Putnam, Jerry Fodor, and John Searle, who contributed to cognitivism, the hard problem of consciousness, and the mind-body problem.

== Society ==
=== Education ===
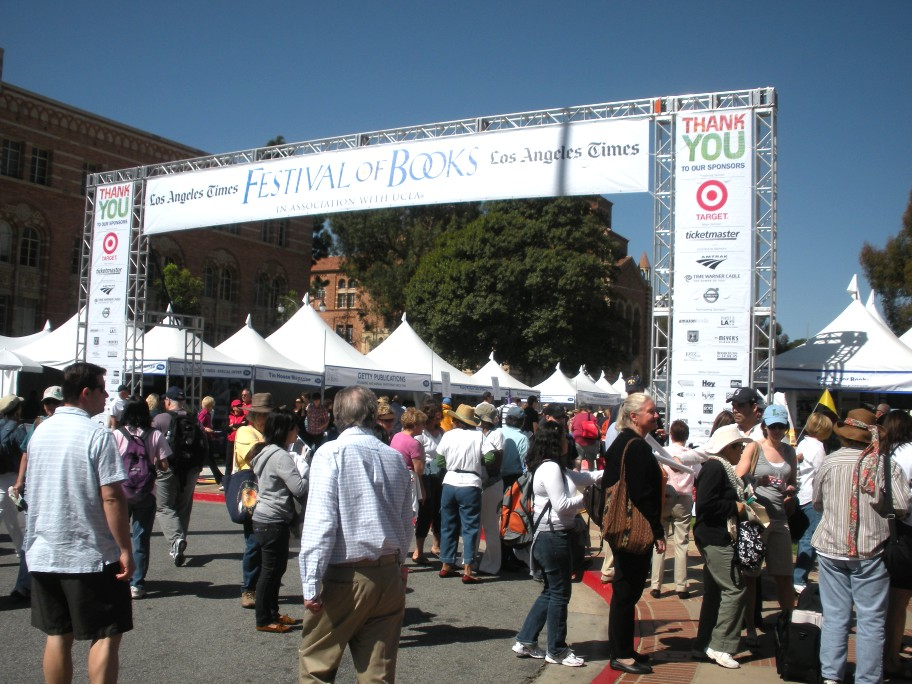
Los Angeles Times Festival of Books is the largest book festival in the United States, annually drawing approximately 150,000 attendees.

In the year 2000, there were 76.6 million students enrolled in schools from kindergarten through graduate schools. Of these, 72 percent aged 12 to 17 were judged academically "on track" for their age (enrolled in school at or above grade level). Of those enrolled in compulsory education, 5.2 million (10.4 percent) were attending private schools. Among the country's adult population, over 85 percent have completed high school and 27 percent have received a bachelor's degree or higher.

The large majority of the world's top universities, as listed by various ranking organizations, are in the United States, including 19 of the top 25, and the most prestigious Harvard University. The country also has by far the most Nobel Prize winners in history, with 403 (having won 406 awards).

=== Gun culture ===
U.S. gun sales have risen in the 21st century, peaking in 2020 during the COVID-19 pandemic. "NICS" is the FBI's National Instant Background Check System.

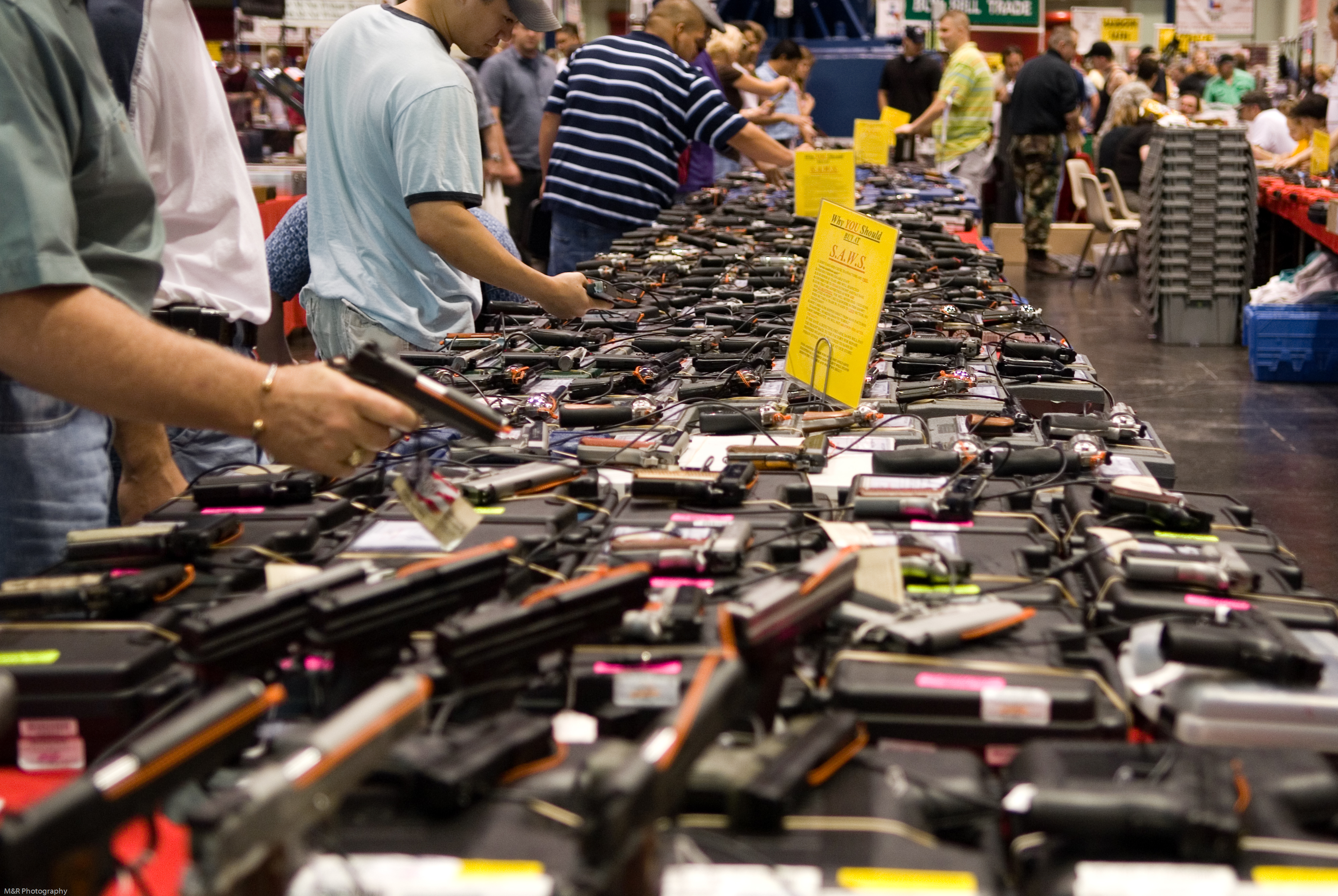
Visitors at a gun show

In sharp contrast to most other nations, firearms laws in the United States are permissive, and private gun ownership is common; almost half of American households contain at least one firearm. The Supreme Court has ruled that the Second Amendment to the United States Constitution protects an individual right to possess modern firearms, subject to reasonable regulation, a view shared by the majority of Americans.

There are more privately owned firearms in the United States than in any other country, both per capita and in total. Civilians in the United States possess about 42% of the global inventory of privately owned firearms. Rates of gun ownership vary significantly by region and by state; gun ownership is most common in Alaska, the Mountain States, and the South, and least prevalent in Hawaii, the island territories, California, and New England. Across the board, gun ownership tends to be more common in rural than in urban areas.

Hunting, plinking, and target shooting are popular pastimes, although ownership of firearms for purely utilitarian purposes such as personal protection is common as well. "Personal protection" was the most common reason given for gun ownership in a 2013 Gallup poll of gun owners, at 60%. Ownership of handguns, while not uncommon, is less common than ownership of long guns. Gun ownership is much more prevalent among men than among women, with men being approximately four times more likely than women to report owning guns.

=== Religion ===
Self-identified religious affiliation in the United States (2023 The Wall Street Journal-NORC poll)
1. Protestantism (26.0%)
2. Catholicism (21.0%)
3. "Just Christian" (20.0%)
4. Mormonism (1.00%)
5. Unitarianism (1.00%)
6. Judaism (2.00%)
7. Buddhism (2.00%)
8. Something else (2.00%)
9. Islam (1.00%)
10. Nothing in particular (12.0%)
11. Agnostic (8.00%)
12. Atheist (4.00%)

Among developed countries, the U.S. is one of the most religious in terms of its demographics. According to a 2002 study by the Pew Global Attitudes Project, the U.S. was the only developed nation in the survey where a majority of citizens reported that religion played a "very important" role in their lives, an opinion similar to that found in Latin America. Today, governments at the national, state, and local levels are secular institutions, with what is often called the "separation of church and state". The most popular religion in the U.S. is Christianity, comprising the majority of the population (73.7% of adults in 2016).

Although participation in organized religion has been diminishing, the public life and popular culture of the United States incorporates many Christian ideals specifically about redemption, salvation, conscience, and morality. Examples are popular culture obsessions with confession and forgiveness, which extends from reality television to twelve-step meetings.

Self-identified religiosity (2023 The Wall Street Journal-NORC poll)
1. Very religious (17.0%)
2. Moderately religious (31.0%)
3. Slightly religious (23.0%)
4. Not religious at all (29.0%)

Most of the British Thirteen Colonies were generally not tolerant of dissident forms of worship. Civil and religious restrictions were most strictly applied by the Puritans of the Massachusetts Bay Colony which saw various banishments applied to enforce conformity, including the branding iron, the whipping post, the bilboes and the hangman's noose. The persecuting spirit was shared by Plymouth Colony and the colonies along the Connecticut river. Mary Dyer was one of the four executed Quakers known as the Boston martyrs, and her death on the Boston gallows marked the beginning of the end of Puritan theocracy and New England independence from English rule; in 1661 Massachusetts was forbidden from executing anyone for professing Quakerism. Anti-Catholic sentiment appeared in New England with the first Pilgrim and Puritan settlers. The Pilgrims of New England held radical Protestant disapproval of Christmas. Christmas observance was outlawed in Boston in 1659. The ban by the Puritans was revoked in 1681 by an English appointed governor; however, it was not until the mid-19th century that celebrating Christmas became common in the Boston region.

The colony of Maryland, founded by the Catholic Lord Baltimore in 1634, came closest to applying freedom of religion.

Modeling the provisions concerning religion within the Virginia Statute for Religious Freedom, the framers of the United States Constitution rejected any religious test for office, and the First Amendment specifically denied the central government any power to enact any law respecting either an establishment of religion or prohibiting its free exercise. In the following decades, the animating spirit behind the constitution's Establishment Clause led to the disestablishment of the official religions within the member states. The framers were mainly influenced by secular, Enlightenment ideals, but they also considered the pragmatic concerns of minority religious groups who did not want to be under the power or influence of a state religion that did not represent them. Thomas Jefferson, author of the Declaration of Independence said, "The priest has been hostile to liberty. He is always in alliance with the despot."

Gallup polls during the early 2020s found that about 81% of Americans believe in some conception of a God and 45% report praying on a daily basis. According to their poll in December 2022, "31% report attending a church, synagogue, mosque or temple weekly or nearly weekly today." In the "Bible Belt", which is located primarily within the Southern United States, socially conservative evangelical Protestantism plays a significant role culturally. New England and the Western United States tend to be less religious. Around 6% of Americans claim a non-Christian faith; the largest of which are Judaism, Islam, Hinduism, and Buddhism. The United States either has the first or second-largest Jewish population in the world, and the largest outside of Israel. "Ceremonial deism" is common in American culture.

Around 30% of Americans describe themselves as having no religion. Membership in a house of worship fell from 70% in 1999 to 47% in 2020, much of the decline related to the number of Americans expressing no religious preference. Membership also fell among those who identified with a specific religious group. According to Gallup, trust in "the church or organized religion" has declined significantly since the 1970s. According to the 2022 Cooperative Election Study, younger Americans are significantly less religious. Among Generation Z, a near-majority consider themselves atheist, agnostic, or nothing in particular.

=== Social class and work ===
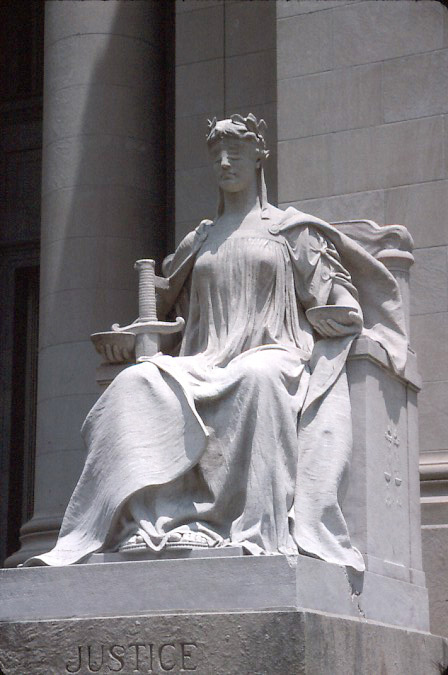
Lady Justice, Shelby County Courthouse, Memphis, Tennessee, United States

Though the majority of Americans in the 21st century identify themselves as middle class, American society has experienced increased income inequality. Social class, generally described as a combination of educational attainment, income and occupational prestige, is one of the greatest cultural influences in America.

Distinct lifestyles, consumption patterns and values are associated with different classes. Early sociologist-economist Thorstein Veblen, for example, said that those at the top of the societal hierarchy engage in conspicuous leisure and conspicuous consumption. Upper class Americans commonly have elite Ivy League educations and are traditionally members of exclusive clubs and fraternities with connections to high society, distinguished by their enormous incomes derived from their wealth in assets. The upper-class lifestyle and values often overlap with that of the upper middle class, but with more emphasis on security and privacy in home life and for philanthropy (i.e. the "Donor Class") and the arts. Due to their large wealth (inherited or accrued over a lifetime of investments) and lavish, leisurely lifestyles, the upper class are more prone to idleness. The upper middle class, or the "working rich", commonly identify education and being cultured as prime values, similar to the upper class. Persons in this particular social class tend to speak in a more direct manner that projects authority, knowledge and thus credibility. They often tend to engage in the consumption of so-called mass luxuries, such as designer label clothing. A strong preference for natural materials, organic foods, and a strong health consciousness tend to be prominent features of the upper middle class. American middle-class individuals in general value expanding one's horizon, partially because they are more educated and can afford greater leisure and travel. Working-class individuals take great pride in doing what they consider to be "real work" and keep very close-knit kin networks that serve as a safeguard against frequent economic instability.

Working-class Americans and many of those in the middle class may also face occupation alienation. In contrast to upper-middle-class professionals who are mostly hired to conceptualize, supervise, and share their thoughts, many Americans have little autonomy or creative latitude in the workplace. As a result, white collar professionals tend to be significantly more satisfied with their work. In 2006, Elizabeth Warren presented her article entitled "The Middle Class on the Precipice", stating that individuals in the center of the income strata, who may still identify as middle class, have faced increasing economic insecurity, supporting the idea of a working-class majority. Additionally, working-class Americans who work in the public sector, excluding politicians, are respected and generally respected in the culture, notably postal workers.

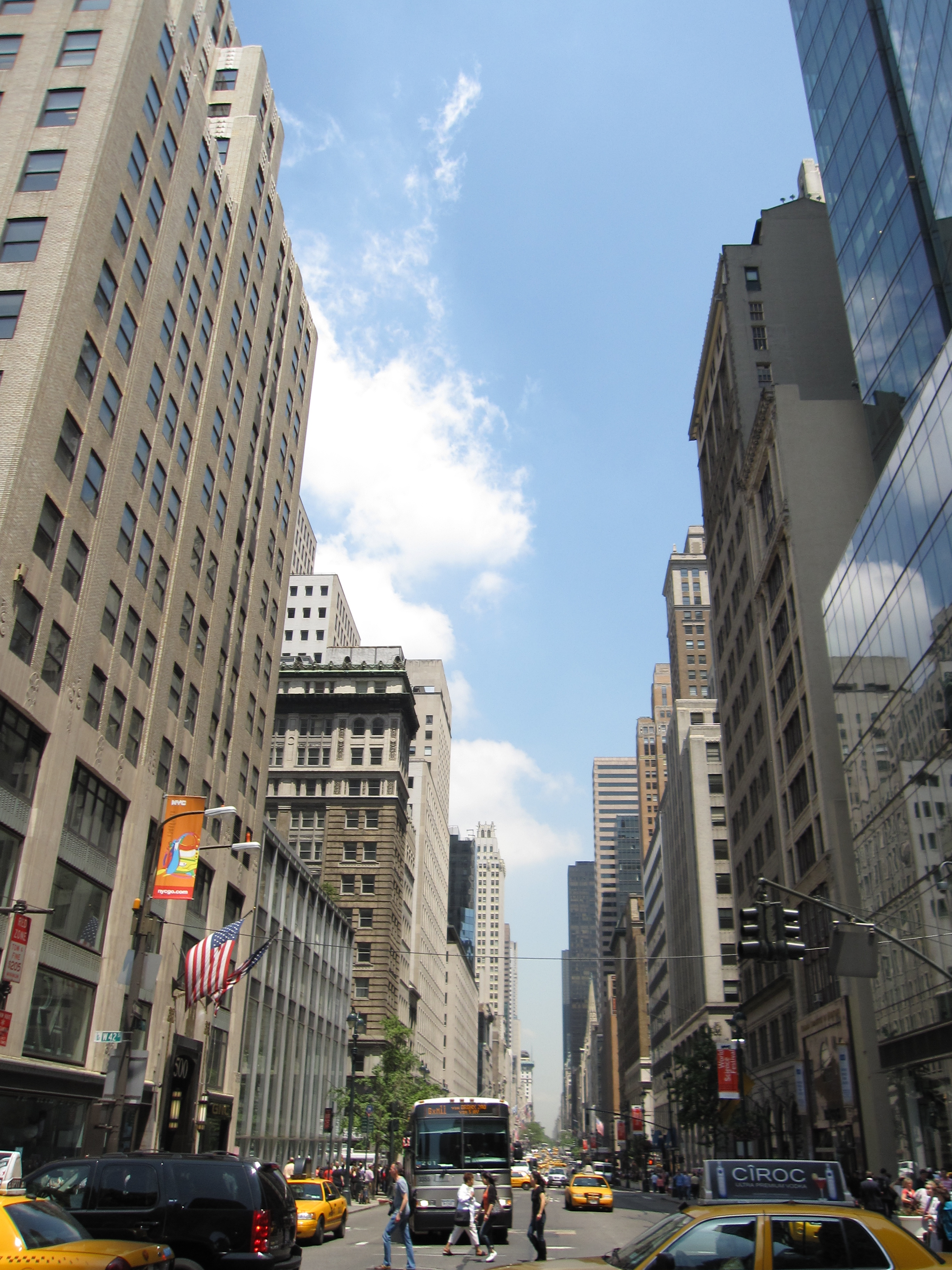
Fifth Avenue in Midtown Manhattan is the most expensive shopping street in the world.

Political behavior is affected by class; more affluent individuals are more likely to vote, and education and income affect whether individuals tend to vote for the Democratic or Republican party. Income also had a significant impact on health as those with higher incomes had better access to health care facilities, higher life expectancy, lower infant mortality rate and increased health consciousness. This is particularly noticeable with black voters who are often socially conservative, yet overwhelmingly vote Democratic.

In the United States, occupation is one of the prime factors of social class and is closely linked to an individual's identity. The average workweek in the U.S. for those employed full-time was 42.9 hours long with 30% of the population working more than 40 hours a week. The Average American worker earned $16.64 an hour in the first two quarters of 2006.

In 2000, the average American worked 1,978 hours per year, 500 hours more than the average German, yet 100 hours less than the average Czech. Overall, the U.S. labor force is one of the most productive in the world, largely due to its workers working more than those in any other post-industrial country, except for South Korea. Americans generally hold working and being productive in high regard. Individualism, having a strong work ethic, competitiveness, and altruism are among the most cited American values. According to a 2016 study by the Charities Aid Foundation, Americans donated 1.44% of total GDP to charity, the highest in the world by a large margin.

=== Race, ancestry, and immigration ===
Film by Edison Studios showing immigrants at Ellis Island in New York Harbor, historically the major entry point for European immigration into the U.S. in the late 19th and early 20th centuries.

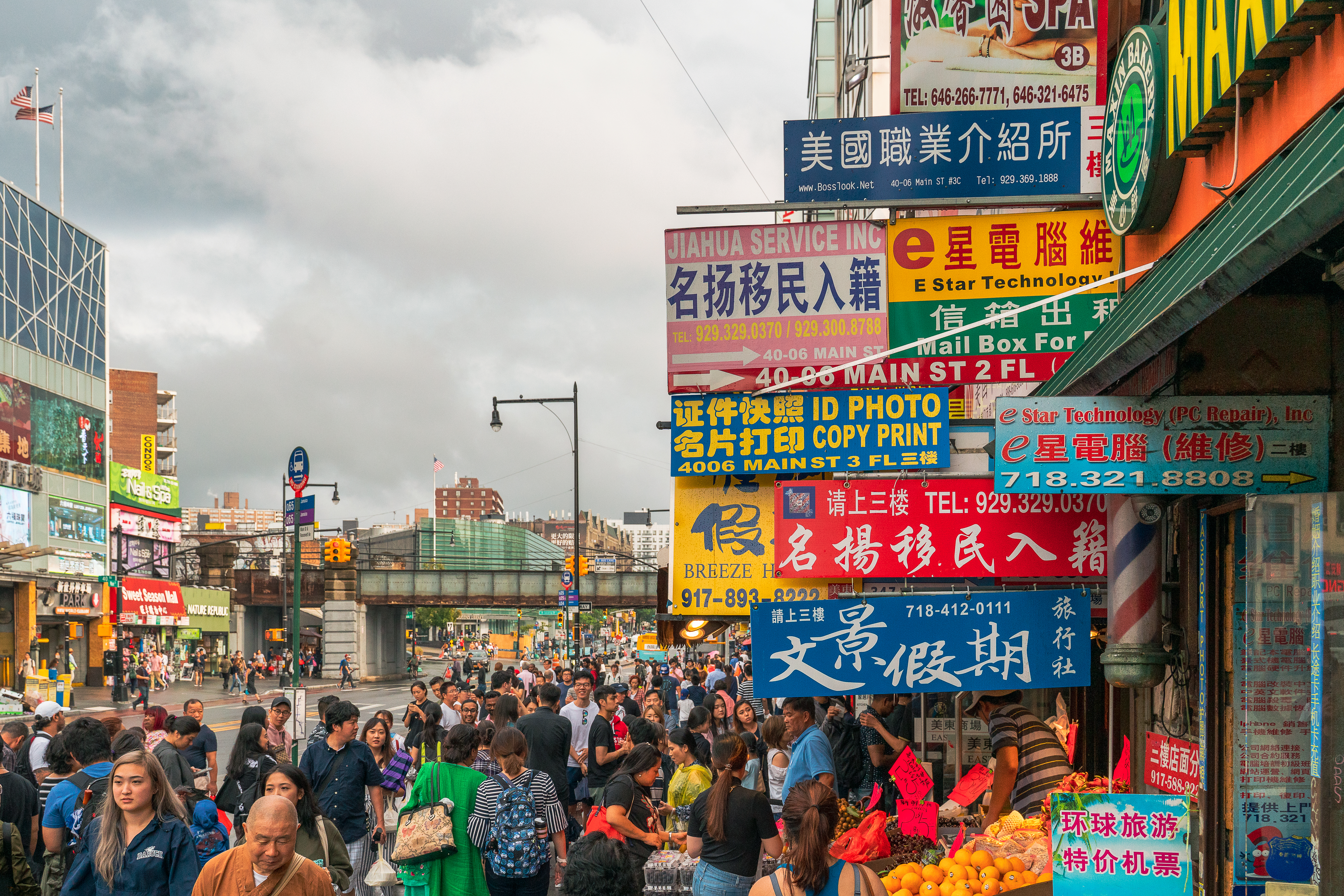
Chinatown, Flushing in Queens, New York City has become the present-day global epicenter receiving Chinese immigration as well as the international control center directing such migration, as Asian immigration has surpassed European immigration to the U.S. in the late 20th into the 21st century.

The United States has an ethnically diverse population, and 37 ancestry groups have more than one million members. White Americans with ancestry from Europe, the Middle East or North Africa, form the largest racial and ethnic group at 57.8% of the U.S. population. Hispanic and Latino Americans form the second-largest group and are 18.7% of the U.S. population. African Americans constitute the nation's third-largest ancestry group and are 12.1% of the total U.S. population. Asian Americans are the country's fourth-largest group, composing 5.9% of the U.S. population, while the country's 3.7 million Native Americans account for about 1%. In 2020, the median age of the U.S. population was 38.5 years.

According to the United Nations, the U.S. has the highest number of immigrant population in the world, with 50,661,149 people. In 2018, there were almost 90 million immigrants and U.S.-born children of immigrants in the U.S., accounting for 28% of the overall U.S. population. In 2017, out of the U.S. foreign-born population, some 45% (20.7 million) were naturalized citizens, 27% (12.3 million) were lawful permanent residents, 6% (2.2 million) were temporary lawful residents, and 23% (10.5 million) were unauthorized immigrants. The U.S. led the world in refugee resettlement for decades, admitting more refugees than the rest of the world combined.

Race in the U.S. is based on physical characteristics, such as skin color, and has played an essential part in shaping American society even before the nation's conception. Until the civil rights movement of the 1960s, racial minorities in the U.S. faced institutional discrimination and both social and economic marginalization. The U.S. Census Bureau currently recognizes five racial groupings: White, African, Native, Asian, and Pacific Islander. According to the U.S. government, Hispanic Americans do not constitute a race, but rather an ethnic group. During the 2000 U.S. census, Whites made up 75.1% of the population; those who are Hispanic or Latino constituted the nation's prevalent minority with 12.5% of the population. African Americans made up 12.3% of the total population, 3.6% were Asian American, and 0.7% were Native American.

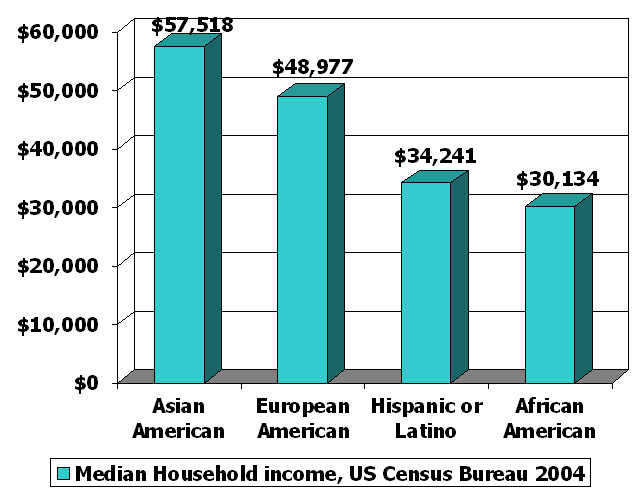
Median household income along ethnic lines in the United States

With its ratification on December 6, 1865, the Thirteenth Amendment to the U.S. Constitution abolished slavery in the U.S. The Northern states had outlawed slavery in their territory in the late 18th and early 19th centuries, though their industrial economies relied on raw materials produced by slaves in the South. Following the Reconstruction period in the 1870s, racist legislation emerged in the Southern states named the Jim Crow laws that provided for legal segregation. Lynching was practiced throughout the U.S., including in the Northern states, until the 1930s, while continuing well into the civil rights movement in the South.

Chinese Americans were earlier marginalized as well during a significant proportion of U.S. history. Between 1882 and 1943, the U.S. instituted the Chinese Exclusion Act barring all Chinese immigrants from entering the U.S. During the Second World War against the Empire of Japan, roughly 120,000 Japanese Americans, 62% of whom were U.S. citizens, were imprisoned in Japanese internment camps by the U.S. government following the attack on Pearl Harbor, an American military base, by Japanese forces in December 1941.

Due to exclusion from or marginalization by earlier mainstream society, there emerged a unique subculture among the racial minorities in the U.S. During the 1920s, Harlem, New York City became home to the Harlem Renaissance. Music styles such as jazz, blues, rap, rock and roll, and numerous folk songs such as Blue Tail Fly (Jimmy Crack Corn) originated within the realms of African American culture and were later adopted by the mainstream. Chinatowns can be found in many cities across the country and Asian cuisine has become a common staple in mainstream America. The Hispanic community has also had a dramatic impact on American culture. Today, Catholics are the largest religious denomination in the U.S. and outnumber Protestants in the Southwest and California.

Asian Americans have median household income and educational attainment exceeding that of other races. African Americans, Hispanics, and Native Americans have considerably lower income and education than do White Americans or Asian Americans.

=== Race relations ===
The plurality ethnic background in each county in the U.S. in 2000: German English Norwegian Dutch Finnish Irish French Italian Mexican Native Spanish American African American Puerto Rican

White Americans (non-Hispanic/Latino and Hispanic/Latino) are the racial majority and have a 72% share of the U.S. population, according to the 2010 U.S. census. Hispanic and Latino Americans comprise 15% of the population, making up the largest ethnic minority. Black Americans are the largest racial minority, comprising nearly 13% of the population. The White, non-Hispanic or Latino population comprises 63% of the nation's total.

Throughout most of the country's history before and after its independence, the majority race in the United States has been Caucasian—aided by historic restrictions on citizenship and immigration—and the largest racial minority has been African Americans, most of whom are descended from slaves smuggled to the Americas by the European colonial powers. This relationship has historically been the most important one since the founding of the United States. Slavery existed in the United States at the time of the country's formation in the 1770s. The Missouri Compromise declared a policy of prohibiting slavery in the remaining Louisiana lands north of the 36°30′ parallel. De facto, it sectionalized the country into two factions: free states, which forbid the institution of slavery; and slave states, which protected the institution. The Missouri Compromise was controversial, seen as lawfully dividing the country along sectarian lines. Although the federal government outlawed American participation in the Atlantic slave trade in 1807, after 1820, cultivation of the highly profitable cotton crop exploded in the Deep South, and along with it, the use of slave labor. The Second Great Awakening, especially in the period 1800–1840, converted millions to evangelical Protestantism. In the North, it energized multiple social reform movements, including abolitionism; in the South, Methodists and Baptists proselytized among slave populations.

In 1882, in response to Chinese immigration due to the Gold Rush and the labor needed for the transcontinental railroad, the government signed into law the Chinese Exclusion Act which banned immigration by Chinese people into the U.S. In the late 19th century, the growth of the Hispanic population in the U.S., fueled largely by Mexican immigration, generated debate over policies such as English as the official language and reform to immigration policies. The Immigration Act of 1924 established the National Origins Formula as the basis of U.S. immigration policy, largely to restrict immigration from Asia, Southern Europe, and Eastern Europe. According to the Office of the Historian of the U.S. Department of State, the purpose of the 1924 Act was "to preserve the ideal of U.S. homogeneity". In 1924, Indian-born Bhagat Singh Thind was twice denied citizenship as he was not deemed white. Marking a radical break from U.S. immigration policies of the past, the Immigration and Nationality Act of 1965 opened entry to the U.S. to non-Germanic groups. This Act significantly altered the demographic mix in the U.S. as a result, creating a modern, diverse America.

A huge majority of Americans of all races disapprove of racism. Nevertheless, some Americans continue to hold negative racial/ethnic stereotypes about various racial and ethnic groups. Professor Imani Perry, of Princeton University, has argued that contemporary racism in the United States "is frequently unintentional or unacknowledged on the part of the actor", believing that racism mostly stems unconsciously from below the level of cognition.

=== Transport ===
==== Automobiles and commuting ====
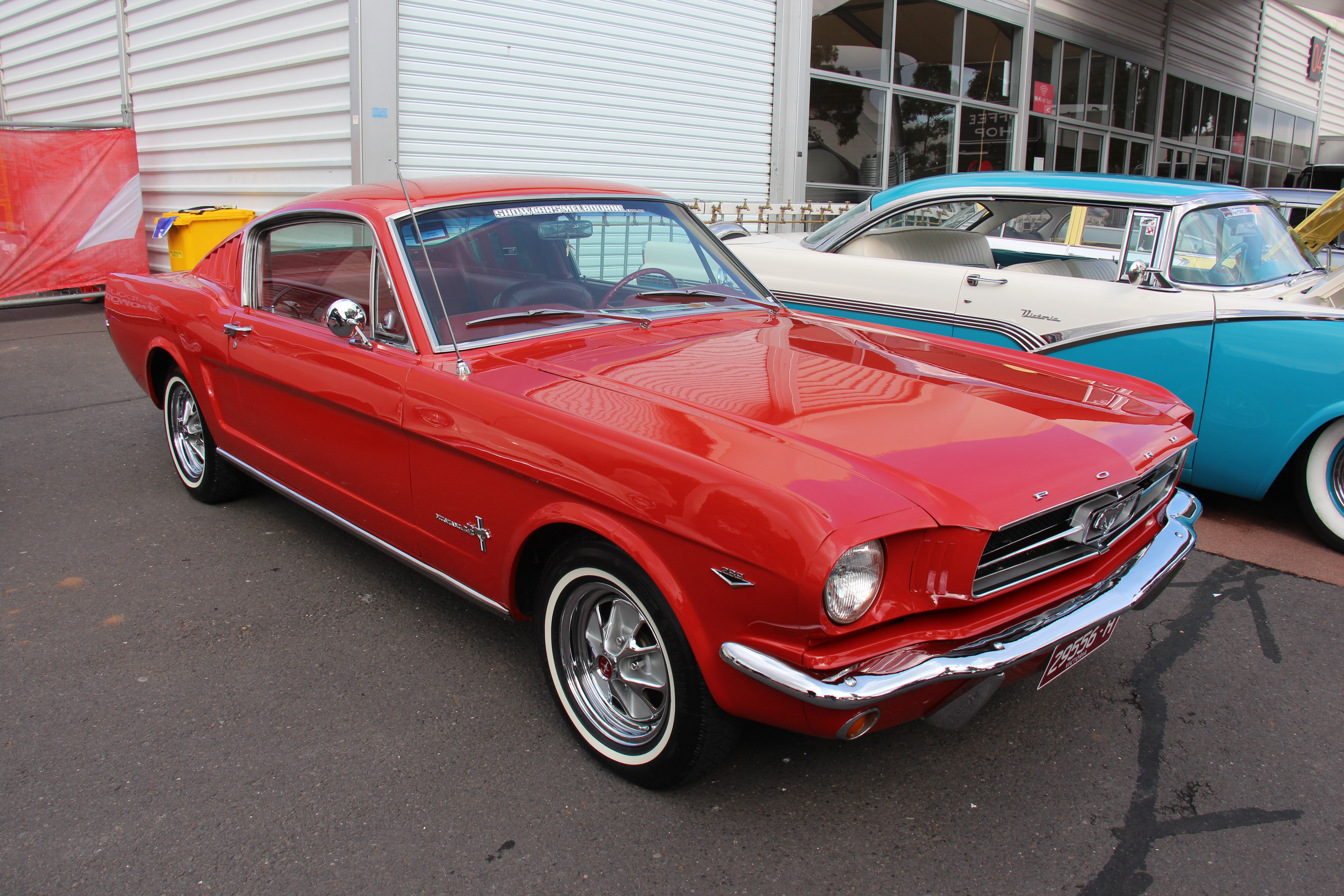
"Pony car": 1965 Ford Mustang "fastback", introduced in September 1964 for the 1965 model year

Personal transportation is dominated by automobiles, which operate on a network of 4 million miles (6.4 million kilometers) of public roads, making it the longest network in the world. In 2001, 90% of Americans drove to work by car. As of 2022, the United States is the second-largest manufacturer of motor vehicles and is home to Tesla, the world's most valuable car company. General Motors held the title of the world's best-selling automaker from 1931 to 2008. Currently, the U.S. has the world's second-largest automobile market by sales and the highest vehicle ownership per capita in the world, with 816.4 vehicles per 1,000 Americans (2014). In 2017, there were 255 million non-two wheel motor vehicles, or about 910 vehicles per 1,000 people.

Beginning in the 1990s, lower energy and land costs favor the production of relatively larger cars, leading to a decline in economy cars. The culture in the 1950s and 1960s often catered to the automobile with motels and drive-in restaurants. Outside of the relatively few urban areas, it is considered a necessity for most Americans to own and drive cars. New York City is the only locality in the United States where more than half of all households do not own a car. In a car-dependent America, there is a common dislike of car dealerships and car salesmen, with only 10 percent of U.S. citizens in a Gallup poll rating them highly honest.

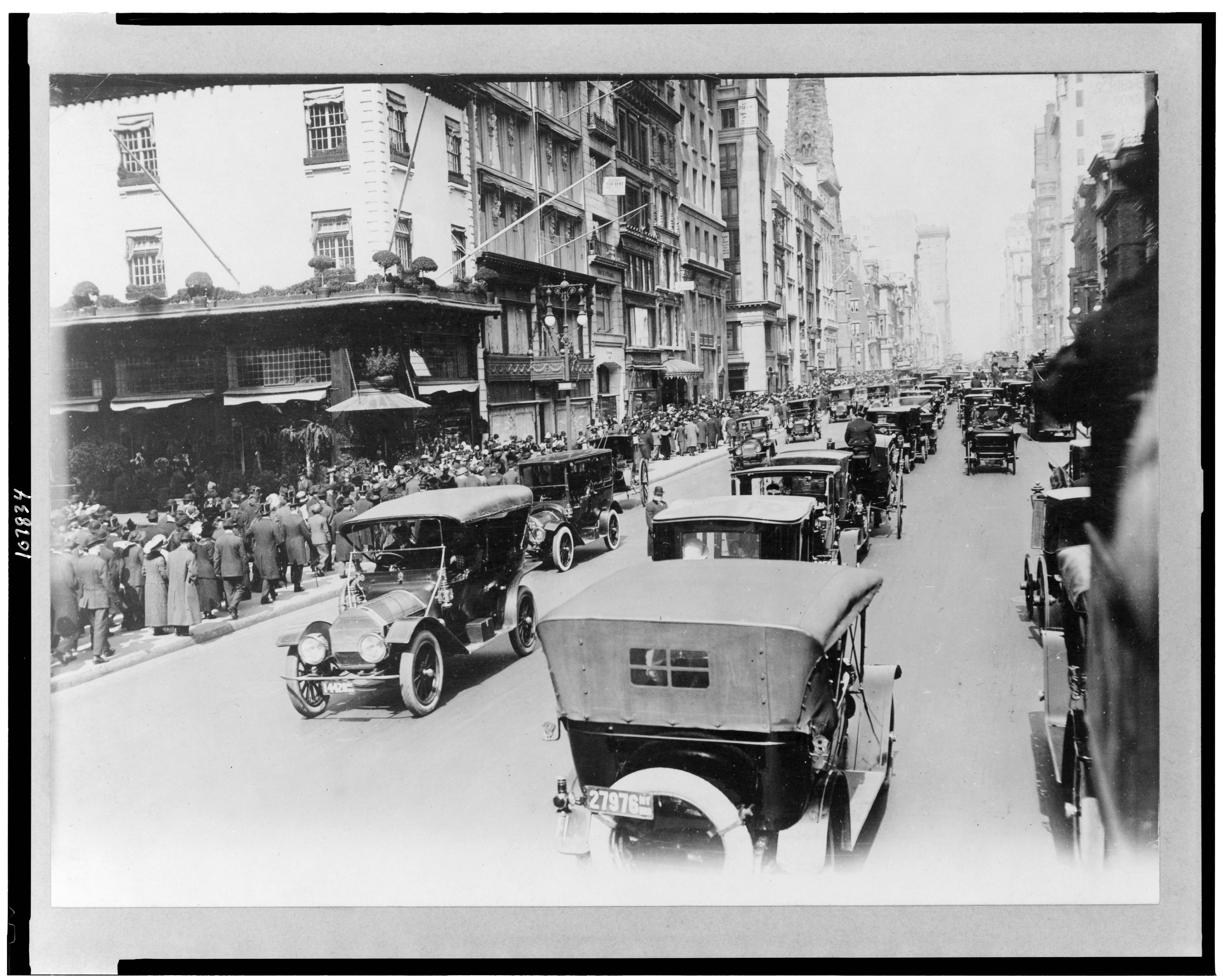
Automobiles on the streets of New York in 1915

The United States emerged as a pioneer of the automotive industry in the early 20th century. General Motors Corporation (GM), the company that would soon become the world's largest automaker, was founded in 1908 by William Durant. The U.S. also became the first country in the world to have a mass market for vehicle production and sales, and mass market production process.

== Cultural institutions ==
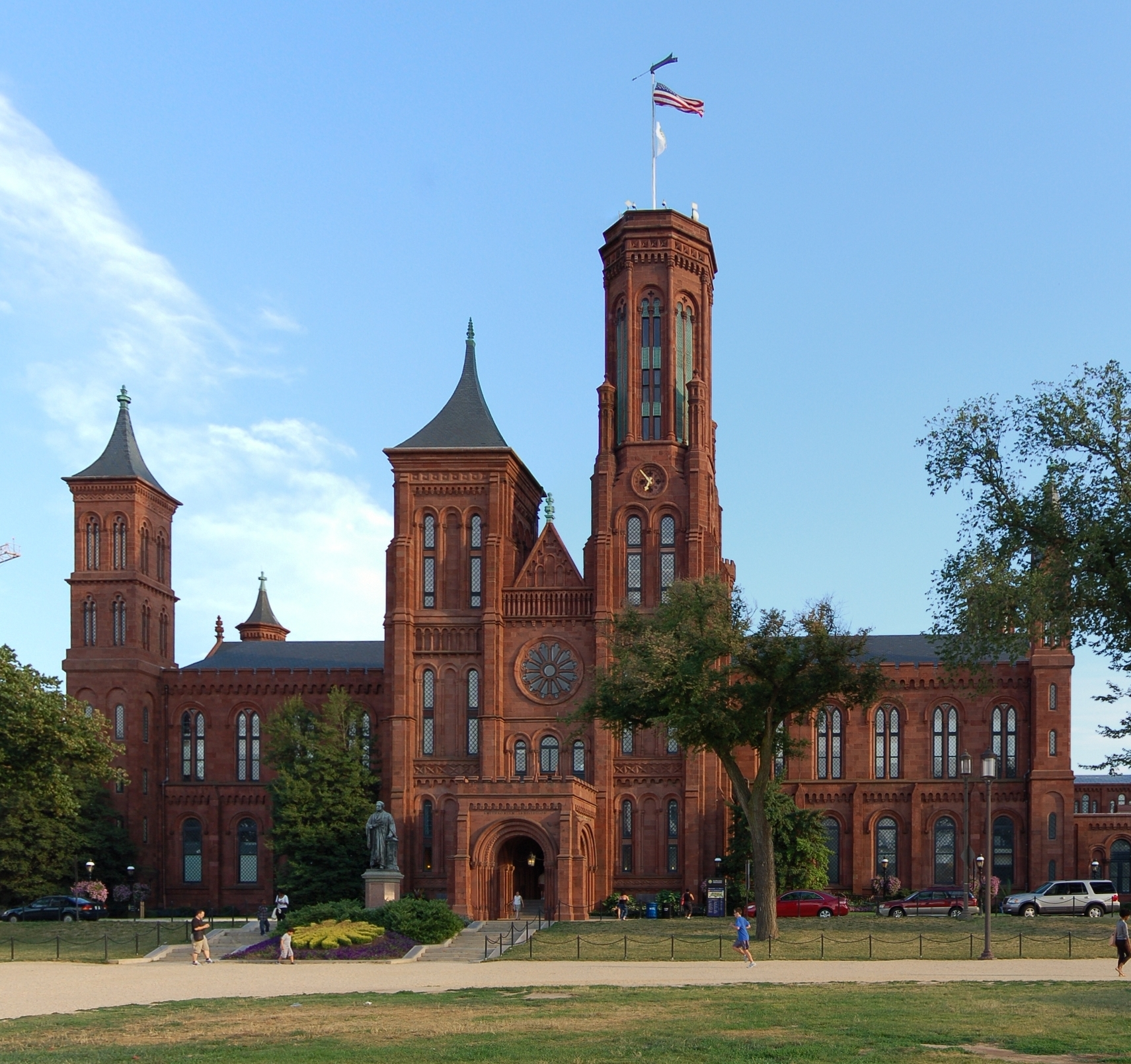
The Smithsonian Institution Building was the first building of the Smithsonian Institution, a cultural institution in Washington, D.C. created by the US government "for the increase and diffusion of knowledge".

=== Governmental culture institutions ===
The United States government does not have a ministry of culture, but there are a number of government institutions with cultural responsibilities, including the President's Committee on the Arts and Humanities, the National Endowment for the Humanities, the National Endowment for the Arts, the Institute of Museum and Library Services, the U.S. Commission of Fine Arts, the Library of Congress, the Smithsonian Institution, the National Gallery of Art, and the National Park Service.

Agencies of the federal government provide funding for art, education, museums, libraries and research to support American culture. The National Endowment for the Arts was established in 1965 by Congress. The agency can help communities around the country with art projects and arts education. In 1965, the National Endowment for the Humanities was also established. It funds museums, and historic sites, schools, universities and libraries, researchers and public media programs.

The Smithsonian Institution was established in 1846 by Congress. It is a federal trust institution for the public education and research. The Smithsonian maintains the National Zoological Park, research centers and museums. These institutions are also involved in preserving history, providing learning opportunities and providing the public with access to art and cultural information.

Many state and city governments have a department dedicated to cultural affairs.

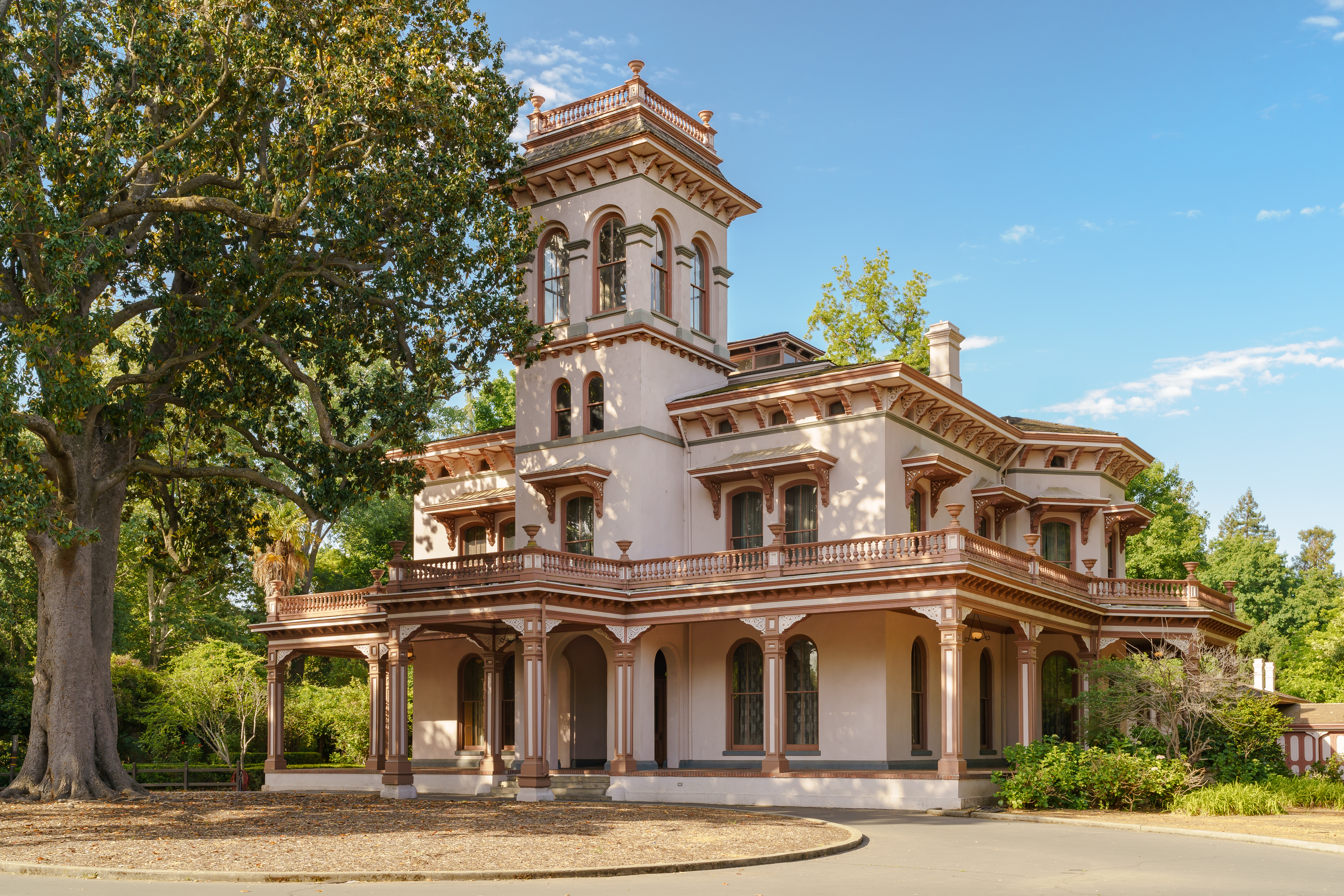
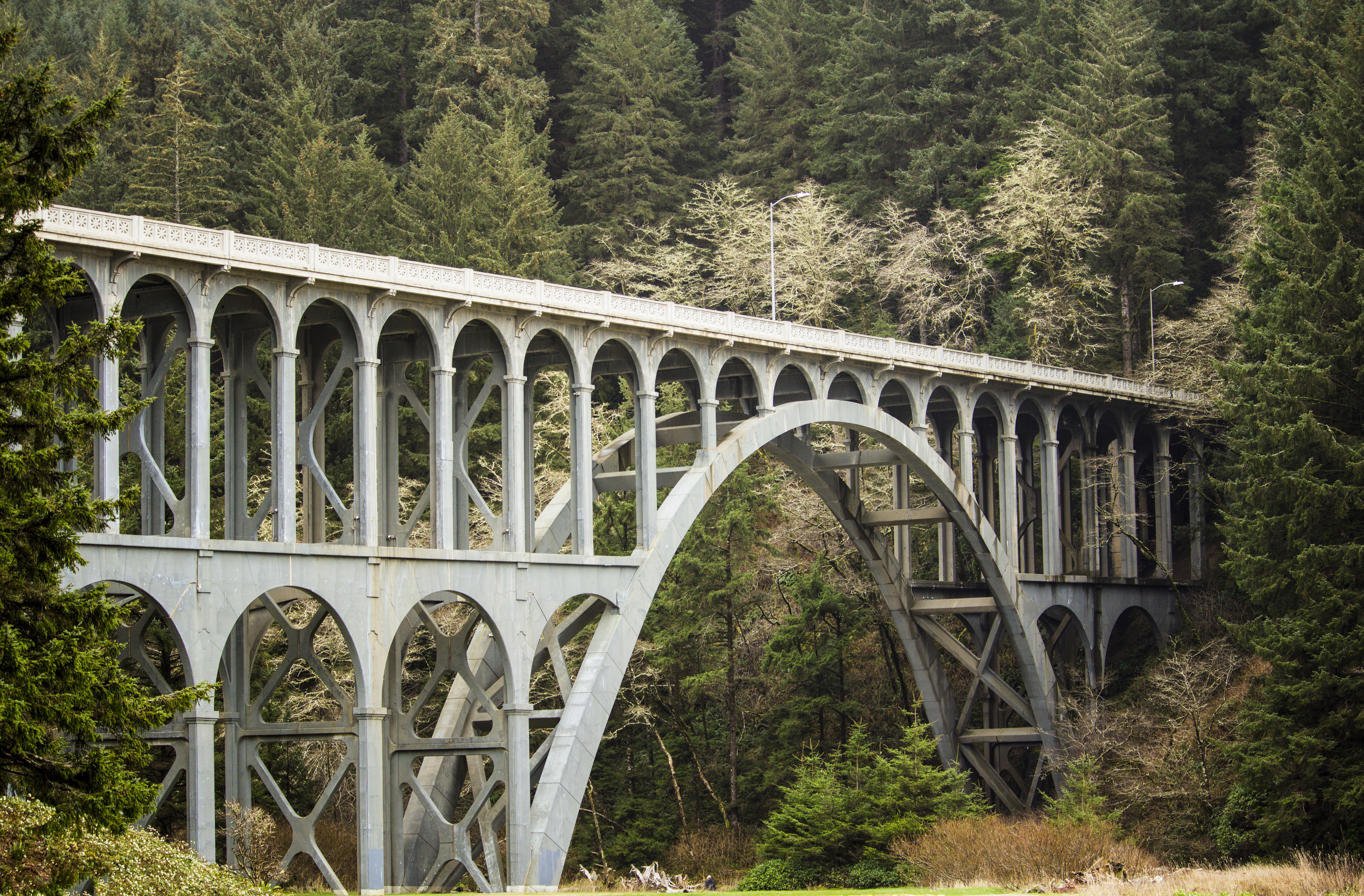
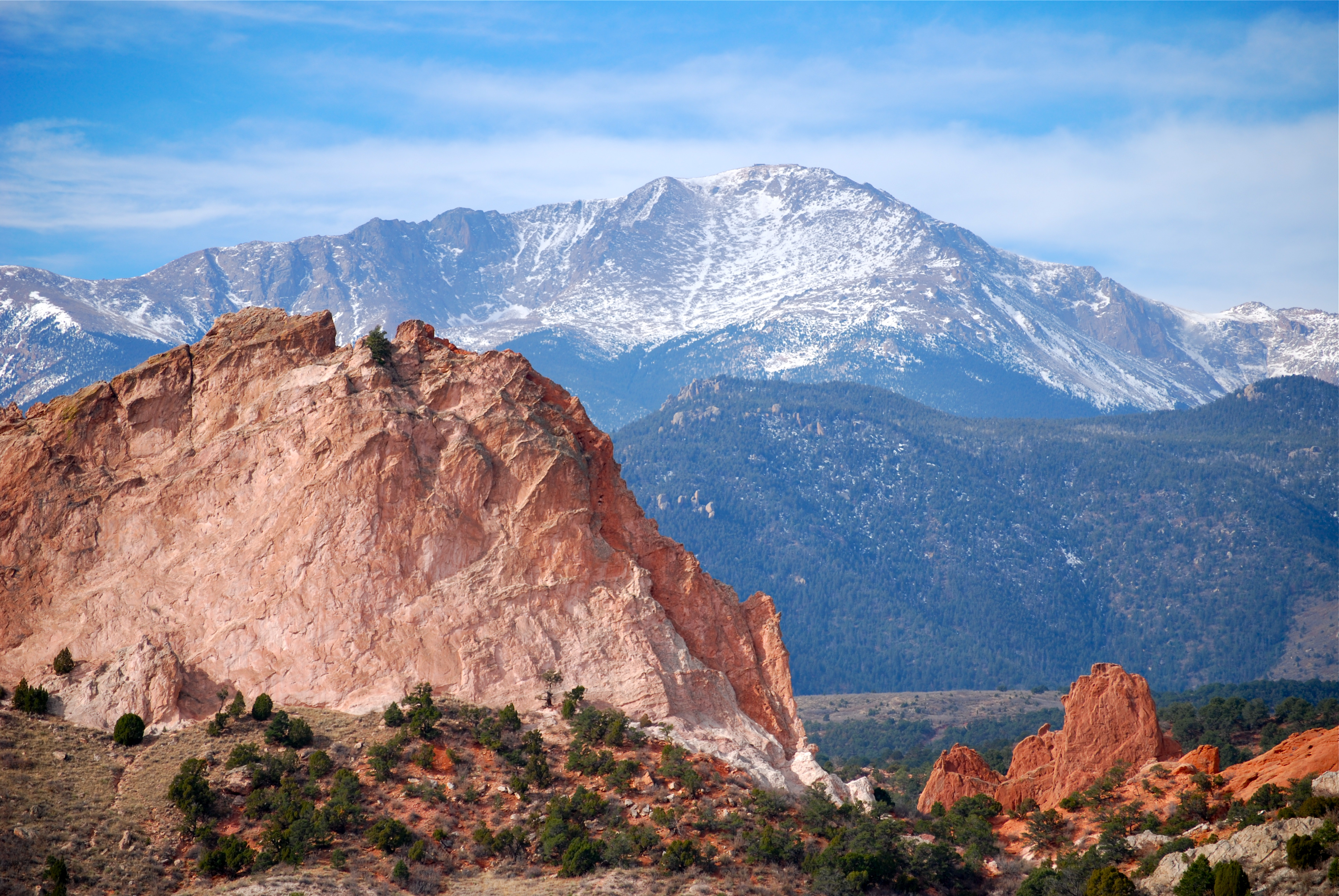
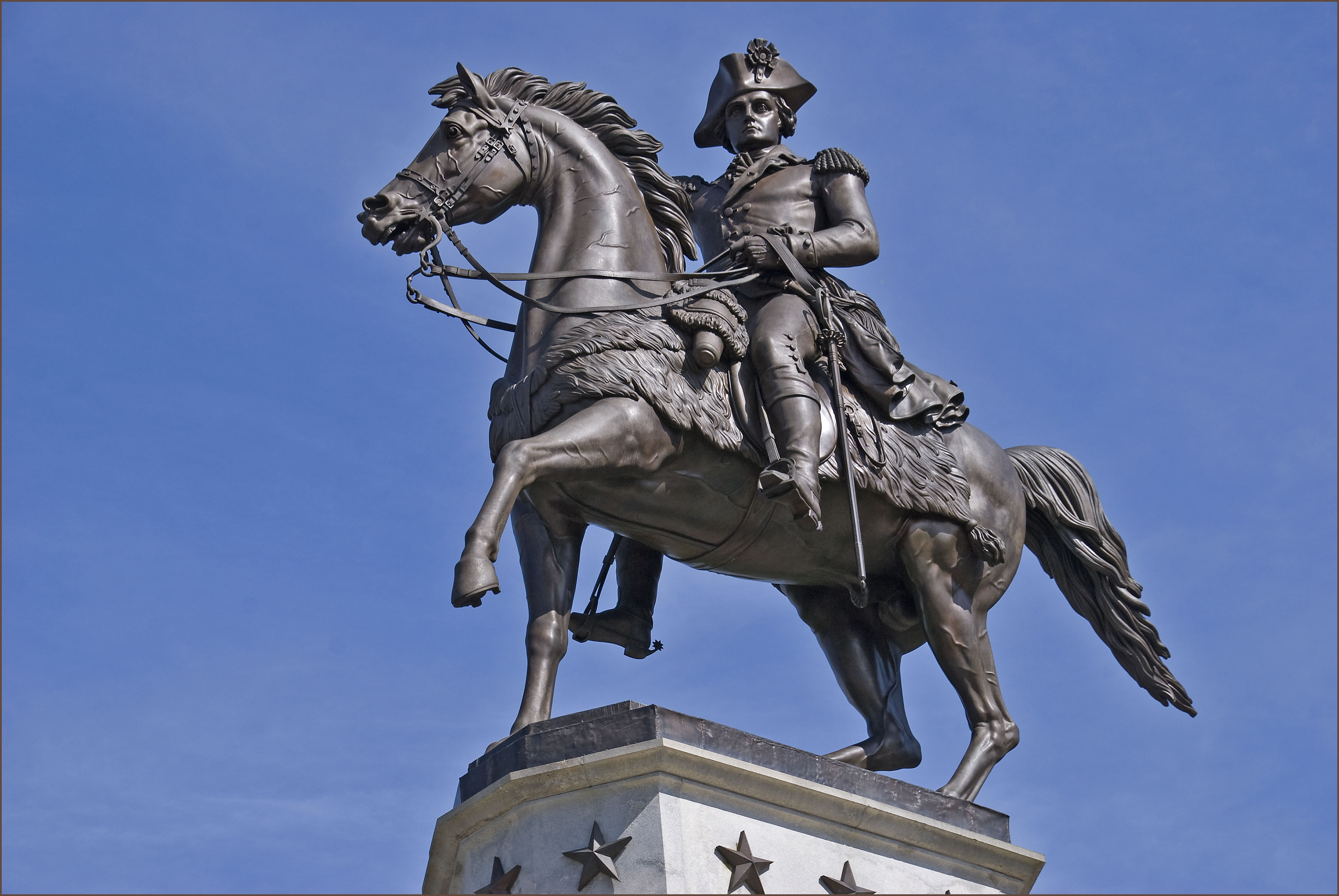
Clockwise from top: a building, a structure, an object and a site—all are examples of NRHP property types.

The National Register of Historic Places (NRHP) is the United States federal government's official list of historic districts, sites, buildings, structures, and objects deemed worthy of preservation for their historical significance or "great artistic value". For most of its history, the National Register has been administered by the National Park Service (NPS), an agency within the U.S. Department of the Interior.

=== Non-governmental culture institutions ===
Major private US-based culture institutions include the Poetry Foundation, the Solomon R. Guggenheim Foundation, the J. Paul Getty Trust and the Andrew W. Mellon Foundation.

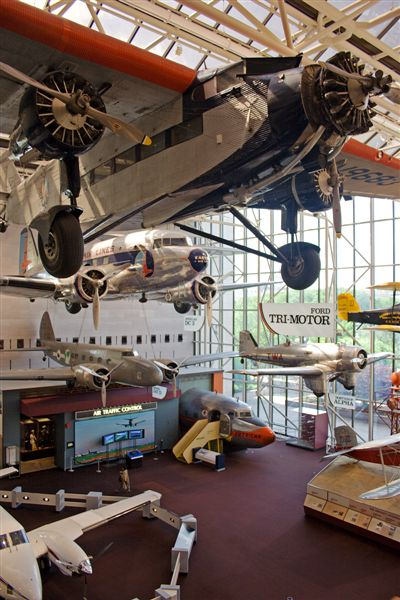
Aircraft at the National Air and Space Museum in Washington, D.C.

In the US, there are many museums, both public and private. Major museums in the US include the Metropolitan Museum of Art, the Museum of Modern Art, the museums of the Smithsonian Institution, the American Museum of Natural History, the Art Institute of Chicago, and The Getty Museum.

There are various archives in the United States for the preservation of history and culture, such as the National Archives and Records Administration.

== See also ==
- African-American culture
- American studies
- American exceptionalism
- Americana
- Etiquette in North America
- Folklore of the United States
- List of libraries in the United States
- Philanthropy in the United States
- Stereotypes of Americans
- Mexican American culture
