= American lower class =

Social class in the United States

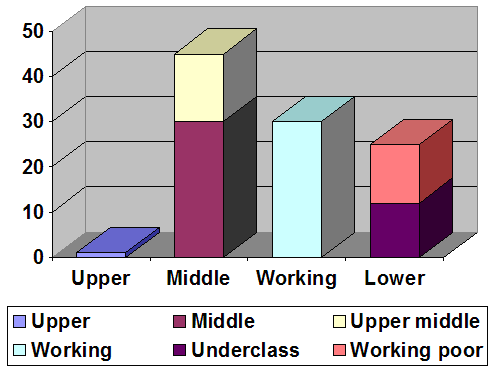
Socioeconomic stratification of American society as outlined by Dennis Gilbert.

Employment status of householders in the bottom quintile in 2004.

In the United States, the lower class are those at or near the lower end of the socioeconomic hierarchy. As with all social classes in the United States, the lower class is loosely defined and its boundaries and definitions subject to debate and ambiguous popular opinions. Sociologists such as W. Lloyd Warner, Dennis Gilbert and James Henslin divide the lower classes into two. The contemporary division used by Gilbert divides the lower class into the working poor and underclass. Service and low-rung manual laborers are commonly identified as being among the working poor. Those who do not participate in the labor force and rely on public assistance as their main source of income are commonly identified as members of the underclass. Overall the term describes those in easily filled employment positions with little prestige or economic compensation who often lack a high school education and are to some extent disenfranchised from mainstream society.

Estimates for how many households are members of this class vary with definition. According to Dennis Gilbert roughly one quarter, 25%, of US households were in the lower classes; 13% were members among the working poor while 12% were members of the underclass. While many in the lower working class are employed in service jobs, lack of participation in the labor force remains the main cause for the economic plight experienced by those in the lower classes. In 2005, the majority of households (56%) in the bottom income quintile had no income earners while 65% of householders did not work. This contrasts starkly to households in the top quintile, 76% of whom had two or more income earners.

Lacking educational attainment as well as disabilities are among the main causes for the infrequent employment. Many households rise above or fall below the poverty threshold, depending on the employment status of household members. While only about 12% of households fall below the poverty threshold at one point in time, the percentage of those who fall below the poverty line at any one point throughout a year is much higher. Working class as well as working poor households may fall below the poverty line if an income earner becomes unemployed. In any given year roughly one out of every five (20%) households falls below the poverty line at some point while up to 40% may fall into poverty within the course of a decade.

== See also ==
- Affluence in the United States
- American middle class
- Household income in the United States
- Personal income in the United States
- Poorest places in the United States
- Poverty and health in the United States
- Poverty in the United States
- Social class in American history
- Social class in the United States
- Wealth inequality in the United States
