= Upper middle class in the United States =

Social class in the United States

Income and wealth, by educational level (US)

Median annual salaries across educational levels varied by a factor of about 3.

Median accumulated household wealth across educational levels varied by a factor of over 50.

In sociology, the upper middle class of the United States is the social group constituted by higher-status members of the middle class in American society. This is in contrast to the term lower middle class, which refers to the group at the opposite end of the middle class scale. There is considerable debate as to how the upper middle class might be defined. According to Max Weber, the upper middle class consists of well-educated professionals with graduate degrees and comfortable incomes.

The American upper middle class is defined using income, education, occupation and the associated values as main indicators. In the United States, the upper middle class is defined as consisting of white-collar professionals who have above-average personal incomes, advanced educational degrees and a high degree of autonomy in their work, leading to higher job satisfaction. The main occupational tasks of upper middle class individuals tend to center on conceptualizing, consulting, and instruction.

== Professions ==
Certain professions can be categorized as "upper middle class," though any such measurement must be considered subjective because of people's differing perception of class. Most people in the upper-middle class strata are highly educated white collar professionals such as but not limited to physicians, dentists, lawyers, military officers, economists, business analysts, urban planners, university professors, architects, psychologists, scientists, managers, accountants, engineers, actuaries, statisticians, pharmacists, high-level civil servants and the intelligentsia.

== Values ==
Education is considered perhaps the most important part of middle-class childrearing as they prepare their children to be successful in school. Most people encompassing this station in life have a high regard for higher education, particularly towards Ivy League colleges and other top-tier schools throughout the United States. They probably, more than any other socio-economic class, strive for themselves and their children to obtain graduate or at least four-year undergraduate degrees, further reflecting the importance placed on education by middle-class families. In 2005, 72% of full-time faculty members at four-year institutions, the majority of whom are upper middle class, identified as liberal.

The upper middle class is often the dominant group to shape society and bring social movements to the forefront. Movements such as the Peace Movement, the anti-nuclear movement, the civil rights movement, feminism, LGBT rights, environmentalism, the anti-smoking movement, and even in the past with the 1960s counterculture, Blue laws and the Temperance movement have been in large part, although not solely, products of the upper middle class. Some claim this is because this is the largest class (and the lowest class) with any true political power for positive change, while others claim some of the more restrictive social movements (such as with smoking and drinking) are based upon "saving people from themselves."

== American upper middle class ==
See American professional/Managerial middle class for a complete overview of the American middle classes.

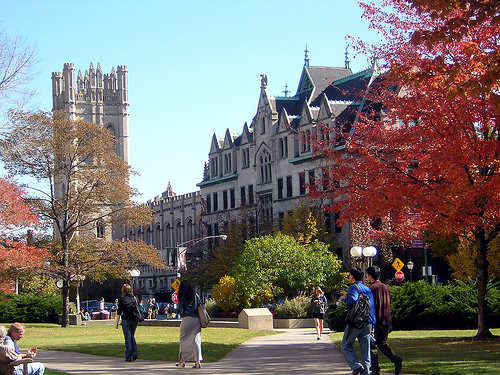
Advanced education is one of the most distinguishing features of the upper middle class.

In the United States the term middle class and its subdivisions are an extremely ambiguous concept as neither economists nor sociologists have precisely defined the term. There are several perceptions of the upper middle class and what the term means. In academic models the term applies to highly educated salaried professionals whose work is largely self-directed. Many have graduate degrees with educational attainment serving as the main distinguishing feature of this class. Household incomes commonly exceed $100,000, with some smaller one-income earners household having incomes in the high 5-figure range.

"The upper middle class has grown...and its composition has changed. Increasingly salaried managers and professionals have replaced individual business owners and independent professionals. The key to the success of the upper middle class is the growing importance of educational certification...its lifestyles and opinions are becoming increasingly normative for the whole society. It is in fact a porous class, open to people ... who earn the right credentials."

— Dennis Gilbert, The American Class Structure, 1998.

In addition to having autonomy in their work, above-average incomes, and advanced educations, the upper middle class also tends to be influential, setting trends and largely shaping public opinion. Overall, members of this class are also secure from economic down-turns and, unlike their counterparts in the statistical middle class, do not need to fear downsizing, corporate cost-cutting, or outsourcing—an economic benefit largely attributable to their graduate degrees and comfortable incomes, likely in the top income quintile or top third. Typical professions for this class include psychologists, professors, accountants, architects, urban planners, engineers, economists, pharmacists, executive assistants, physicians, optometrists, dentists, and lawyers.

== Income ==
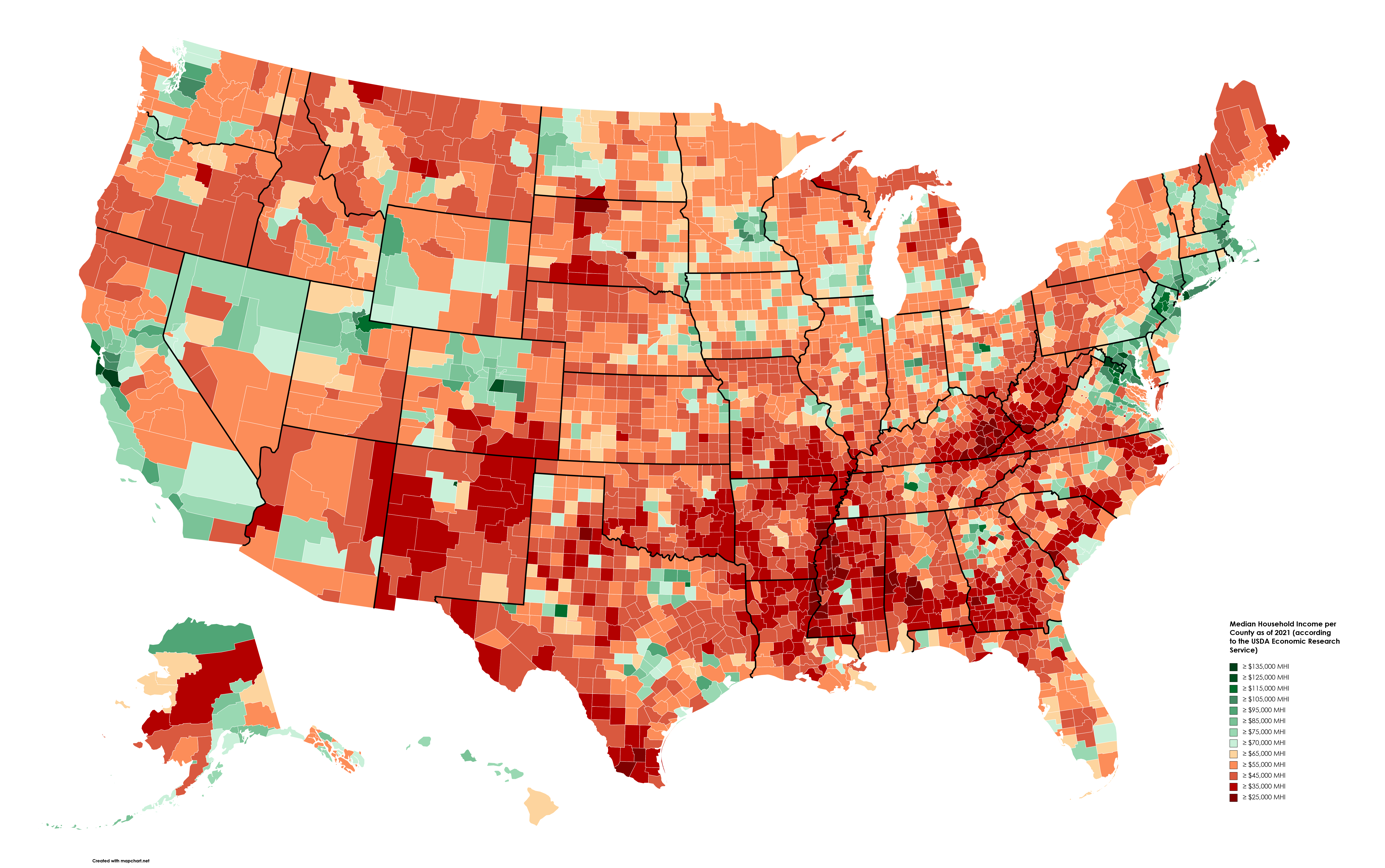
Median U.S. household income per county in 2021, showing the distribution of income geographically in the United States

While many Americans see income as the prime determinant of class, occupational status, educational attainment, and value systems are equally important. Income is in part determined by the scarcity of certain skill sets. As a result, an occupation that requires a scarce skill, the attainment of which is often achieved through an educational degree, and entrusts its occupant with a high degree of influence will usually offer high economic compensation. There are also differences between household and individual income. Sociologists Dennis Gilbert, Willam Thompson and Joseph Hickey estimate the upper middle class to constitute roughly 15% of the population.

=== Distribution of household income in 2022 according to US Census data ===
US Census Bureau figures for 2022
Income of Household	Number (thousands)	Percent in Group	Percent At or Below	Mean Income	Mean number of earners	Mean size of household
Total	131,400	—	—	$106,400	1.30	2.51
Under $5,000	4,305	3.28	3.28	$877	0.13	1.89
$5,000 to $9,999	2,131	1.62	4.90	$7,626	0.41	1.75
$10,000 to $14,999	4,536	3.45	8.35	$12,440	0.27	1.54
$15,000 to $19,999	4,725	3.60	11.95	$17,350	0.37	1.62
$20,000 to $24,999	5,047	3.84	15.79	$22,250	0.51	1.76
$25,000 to $29,999	4,728	3.60	19.39	$27,210	0.59	1.95
$30,000 to $34,999	5,285	4.02	23.41	$32,000	0.75	2.03
$35,000 to $39,999	4,674	3.56	26.96	$37,080	0.82	2.11
$40,000 to $44,999	4,761	3.62	30.59	$41,960	0.89	2.17
$45,000 to $49,999	4,453	3.39	33.98	$47,130	0.98	2.23
$50,000 to $54,999	4,838	3.68	37.66	$51,880	1.06	2.27
$55,000 to $59,999	4,252	3.24	40.89	$57,030	1.10	2.31
$60,000 to $64,999	4,463	3.40	44.29	$61,880	1.19	2.40
$65,000 to $69,999	3,867	2.94	47.23	$67,100	1.26	2.46
$70,000 to $74,999	3,904	2.97	50.20	$71,990	1.30	2.51
$75,000 to $79,999	3,669	2.79	53.00	$76,970	1.41	2.50
$80,000 to $84,999	3,505	2.67	55.66	$81,950	1.43	2.61
$85,000 to $89,999	3,061	2.33	57.99	$87,090	1.50	2.68
$90,000 to $94,999	3,132	2.38	60.38	$91,930	1.54	2.69
$95,000 to $99,999	2,838	2.16	62.54	$97,140	1.60	2.77
$100,000 to $104,999	3,312	2.52	65.06	$101,800	1.59	2.66
$105,000 to $109,999	2,321	1.77	66.82	$107,100	1.67	2.89
$110,000 to $114,999	2,462	1.87	68.70	$112,000	1.78	3.02
$115,000 to $119,999	2,188	1.67	70.36	$117,100	1.81	2.89
$120,000 to $124,999	2,421	1.84	72.21	$121,800	1.71	2.90
$125,000 to $129,999	2,086	1.59	73.79	$127,100	1.80	2.99
$130,000 to $134,999	1,996	1.52	75.31	$132,000	1.87	3.07
$135,000 to $139,999	1,730	1.32	76.63	$137,000	1.82	3.01
$140,000 to $144,999	1,680	1.28	77.91	$141,900	1.92	3.05
$145,000 to $149,999	1,375	1.05	78.95	$147,200	2.00	2.95
$150,000 to $154,999	2,005	1.53	80.48	$151,900	1.84	2.91
$155,000 to $159,999	1,389	1.06	81.54	$157,000	1.99	3.06
$160,000 to $164,999	1,461	1.11	82.65	$162,000	1.89	2.90
$165,000 to $169,999	1,131	0.86	83.51	$167,100	2.06	3.14
$170,000 to $174,999	1,144	0.87	84.38	$172,100	2.02	3.25
$175,000 to $179,999	1,043	0.79	85.17	$177,100	2.07	3.22
$180,000 to $184,999	1,106	0.84	86.02	$182,100	2.07	3.26
$185,000 to $189,999	921	0.70	86.72	$187,100	2.14	3.12
$190,000 to $194,999	940	0.72	87.43	$192,100	2.16	3.36
$195,000 to $199,999	889	0.68	88.11	$197,200	2.08	3.26
$200,000 to $249,999	6,024	4.58	92.69	$221,100	2.11	3.24
$250,000 and over	9,636	7.33	100.00	$426,600	2.11	3.24

== See also ==
- Bourgeoisie
- Middle class
- Social class

=== US-specific ===
- Affluence in the United States
- American middle class
- American upper class
- Educational attainment in the United States
- Household income in the United States
- Millionaire
- Personal income in the United States
- Social class in the United States
