= Upper middle class =

Social class

In sociology, the upper-middle class is the social group constituted by higher status members of the middle class, in contrast to the lower middle class. The definition is debated. Max Weber controversially defined it as the group of professionals with postgraduate degrees, but most Americans and Europeans identify income, autonomy within work, and cultural privilege, as the primary determiners of class. The typical occupational tasks of upper-middle class individuals are conceptualizing and instruction.

== American upper-middle class ==
The definition of the American middle class (and its subdivisions) is contested. In academic models, the term "upper-middle class" applies to highly salaried professionals whose work enables above-average autonomy. Household incomes exceed $100,000 (equivalent to $164,849 in 2025). Professions for this class may include: judges, senior military officers, financial planners, engineers, professors, architects, airline pilots, and businessmen.

The upper-middle class has grown ... and its composition has changed. Increasingly salaried managers and professionals have replaced individual business owners and independent professionals. The key to the success of the upper-middle class is the growing importance of educational certification ... its lifestyles and opinions are becoming increasingly normative for the whole society. It is in fact a porous class, open to people ... who earn the right credentials.

— Dennis Gilbert, The American Class Structure, 1998

In addition to the above-average autonomy in their work and their higher incomes, the upper-middle class also tends to be socioculturally influential. Most members of this class are secure from economic downturns and, unlike their counterparts in the statistical middle class, are mostly unaffected by corporate cost-cutting and outsourcing, because of their advanced experience and education. Their incomes are usually in the top income quintile or top third.

=== Income ===
Whilst many Americans believe that income is the primary determiner of class: occupation, cultural privilege, and educational attainment, are important. Income is determined by the replaceability of skills. A socially contributive occupation that needs seldom encountered skills will offer higher remuneration. There are also differences between household and individual income. In 2005, 42% of US households (76% among the top quintile) had two or more income earners; as a result, 18% of households but only 5% of individuals had six-figure incomes. To illustrate, two nurses each making $55,000 per year can out-earn, in a household sense, a single attorney who makes a median of $95,000 annually.

Sociologists Dennis Gilbert, William Thompson and Joseph Hickey estimate the upper-middle class to constitute roughly 15% of the population. Using the 15% figure one may define the American upper-middle class consists as the group of persons whose personal income exceeds $62,500 ($101,000 in 2024 dollars), who commonly reside in households with six-figure incomes. The difference between personal and household income can be explained by considering that 76% of households with incomes exceeding $90,000 (the top 20%, $170,000 to cross this threshold in 2020 dollars) had two or more income earners. In 2024, the threshold for entering the top 10% of American household incomes is $230,000

Income statistics (2006)
Data	Top third	Top quarter	Top quintile	Top 15%	Top 10%	Top 5%
Household income
Lower threshold (annual gross income)	$65,000	$80,000	$91,705	$100,000	$118,200	$166,200
Exact percentage of households	34.72%	25.60%	20.00%	17.80%	10.00%	5.00%
Personal income (age 25+)
Lower threshold (annual gross income)	$37,500	$47,500	$52,500	$62,500	$75,000	$100,000
Exact percentage of individuals	33.55%	24.03%	19.74%	14.47%	10.29%	5.63%

Income statistics (2024) (source from 2006, inflation adjusted)
Data	Top third	Top quarter	Top quintile	Top 15%	Top 10%	Top 5%
Household income
Lower threshold (annual gross income)	$103,000	$127,000	$145,000	$158,618	$187,000	$263,000
Exact percentage of households	34.72%	25.60%	20.00%	17.80%	10.00%	5.00%
Personal income (age 25+)
Lower threshold (annual gross income)	$59,000	$75,000	$83,000	$99,000	$119,000	$159,000
Exact percentage of individuals	33.55%	24.03%	19.74%	14.47%	10.29%	5.63%

The above income thresholds may vary greatly based on region due to significant differences in average income based on region and urban, suburban, or rural development. In more expensive suburbs, the threshold for the top 15% of income earners may be much higher. For example, in 2006 the ten highest income counties had median household incomes of $85,000 compared to a national average of about $50,000. The top 15% of all US income earners nationally tend to be more concentrated in these richer suburban counties where the cost of living is also higher. If middle-class households earning between the 50th percentile ($46,000) and the 85th percentile ($62,500) tend to live in lower cost of living areas, then their difference in real income may be smaller than what the differences in nominal income suggest.

=== Values ===
Political ideology is not correlated with social class. In terms of income, liberals tend to be tied with pro-business conservatives. Most mass affluent households tend to be more right-leaning on fiscal issues but more left-leaning on social issues. The majority, between 50% and 60%, of households with incomes above $50,000 overall, not all of whom are upper-middle class, supported the Republican Party in the 2000, 2004, and 2006 elections.

The upper-middle class is often the group that creates popular social movements, such as the peace movement, the anti-nuclear movement, environmentalism, the anti-smoking movement, and in the past the blue laws and the temperance movement. Some people claim that this is because it is the largest class (and also the lowest class) to have any economic power to fund campaigns for change, whilst others claim that it is because of their self-assumed moral responsibility to "save [less intelligent] people from themselves".

== British upper-middle class ==
The British upper-middle class consists of people who were educated at a private preparatory school and a private public school, and who have a high degree of autonomy in their work and an income within the highest tax bracket. Most of its members use Received Pronunciation.

== See also ==
- Bildungsbürgertum
- Black elite
- Bourgeoisie
- Chungin
- Grand Burgher
- Hipster (contemporary subculture)
- Professional–managerial class
- Upper class
- Yuppie
