= Types of social groups =

Social groups

In the social sciences, social groups can be categorized based on the various group dynamics that define social organization. In sociological terms, groups can fundamentally be distinguished from one another by the extent to which their nature influence individuals and how. A primary group, for instance, is a small social group whose members share close, personal, enduring relationships with one another (e.g. family, childhood friend). By contrast, a secondary group is one in which interactions are more impersonal than in a primary group and are typically based on shared interests, activities, and/or achieving a purpose outside the relationship itself (e.g. coworkers, schoolmates).

Four basic types of groups have traditionally been recognized: primary groups, secondary groups, collective groups, and categories.

== Primary and secondary groups ==
The distinction between primary and secondary groups serves to identify between two orders of social organization.

=== Primary groups ===
A primary group is typically a small social group whose members share close, personal, enduring relationships in which one exchanges implicit items, such as love, caring, concern, support, etc. These groups are often long-lasting and marked by members' concern for one another, where the goal is actually the relationship themselves rather than achieving another purpose. In general, they are also psychologically comforting to the individuals involved, providing a source of support. As such, primary groups or lack thereof play an important role in the development of personal identity, and can be understood as tight circles composed of people such as family, long-term romances, crisis-support group, church group, etc.

The concept of the primary group was first introduced in 1909 by sociologist Charles Cooley, a member of the famed Chicago school of sociology, through a book titled Social Organization: A Study of the Larger Mind. Although Cooley had initially proposed the term to denote the first intimate group of an individual's childhood, the classification would later extend to include other intimate relations.

Additionally, three sub-groups of primary groups can be also identified:

1. Kin (relatives)
2. Close friends
3. Neighbours

=== Secondary groups (social groups) ===
A secondary group is a relatively larger group composed of impersonal and goal-oriented relationships, which are often temporary. These groups are often based on achieving a common purpose outside of the relationship itself and involve much less emotional investment. Since secondary groups are established to perform functions, individual roles are more interchangeable, thus members are able to leave and outgroup are able to join with relative ease. Such groups can be understood to be ones in which individuals exchange explicit commodities (e.g. labour for wage, service for payment, etc.). Examples include study groups, sports teams, schoolmates, attorney-client, doctor-patient, coworkers, etc.

Cooley had made the distinction between primary and secondary groups, by noting that the term for the latter refers to relationships that generally develop later in life, likely with much less influence on one's identity than primary groups.

== Collectives ==
A collective is a large group of individuals whose relationships to one another are loosely formed, spontaneous, and brief. Members are generally connected through performing similar actions or possessing similar outlooks. As they only exist for a very brief period of time, it is very easy for an out-group member to become an in-group member and vice versa. Examples of collectives include audiences at a show, bystanders, people at the park, etc.

== Collectivities ==
A collectivity comprises "any grouping wider than the individual".

== Categories ==
Categories are characterized by an aggregate of individuals who share something in common, but only become groups when their similarities have social implications. Categories can appear to be higher in entitativity and essentialism than primary, secondary, and collective groups. This group is generally the largest type of such, where members can be either permanently or temporarily in-group. Categories can include individuals with the same ethnicity, gender, religion, or nationality. For example, Torontonians, women, and gamers can all be characterized as categories.

Campbell (1958) famously defines entitativity as the extent to which collections of individuals are perceived to be a group. The degree of entitativity that a group has is influenced by whether a collection of individuals experience the same fate, display similarities, and are close in proximity. If individuals believe that a group is high in entitativity, then they are likely to believe that the group has unchanging characteristics that are essential to the group, known as essentialism.

== Reference groups ==
A reference group is a group to which an individual or another group is compared, used by sociologists in reference to any group that is used by an individual as a standard for evaluating themselves and their own behavior. More simply, as explained by Thompson and Hickey (2005), such groups are ones "that people refer to when evaluating their [own] qualities, circumstances, attitudes, values and behaviors."

Reference groups are used in order to evaluate and determine the nature of a given individual or other group's characteristics and sociological attributes. It is the group to which the individual relates or aspires to relate him or herself psychologically. It becomes the individual's frame of reference and source for ordering his or her experiences, perceptions, cognition, and ideas of self. It is important for determining a person's self-identity, attitudes, and social ties. It becomes the basis of reference in making comparisons or contrasts and in evaluating one's appearance and performance.

Reference groups provide the benchmarks and contrast needed for comparison and evaluation of group and personal characteristics. Robert K. Merton hypothesized that individuals compare themselves with reference groups of people who occupy the social role to which the individual aspires.

[Merton] developed a theory of the reference group (i.e., the group to which individuals compare themselves, which is not necessarily a group to which those individuals belong), and elaborated on the concepts of in-group and out-group. For any group of people there are always other groups whom they look upon to and aspire to be like them.

Such groups act as a frame of reference to which people always refer to evaluate their achievements, their role performance, aspirations and ambitions. A reference group can be either from a membership group or non-membership group. An example of a reference group being used would be the determination of affluence. An individual in the U.S. with an annual income of $80,000, may consider themself affluent if they compare themself to those in the middle of the income strata, who earn roughly $32,000 a year. If, however, the same person considers the relevant reference group to be those in the top 0.1% of households in the US, those making $1.6 million or more, then the individual's income of $80,000 would make them consider themself as rather poor.

== Examples ==
- Basic groups: The smallest possible social group with a defined number of people (i.e. greater than 1)—often associated with family building:
  - Dyad: Will be a group of two people. Social interaction in a dyad is typically more intense than in larger groups as neither member shares the other's attention with anyone else. (See also couple.)
  - Triad: A group of three people. Triads are generally more stable than dyads because one member can act as a mediator should the relationship between the other two become strained.
- Family, Household: Small group of people who live in the same home. Family may or may not form clan, fellowship, larger kinship groups, or a basic unit of community. Various cultures include different models of households, including the nuclear family, blended families, share housing, and group homes.
- Crew or Band: Small group of skilled people with common interest; a rowing crew; a music band; construction crew; subunit of a tribe as band society.
- Peer group: A group with members of approximately the same age, social status, and interests. Generally, people are relatively equal in terms of power when they interact with peers.
- Clique: A group of people that have many of the same interests & commonly found in a high school/college setting; most of the time they have a name & rules for themselves.
- Club: A group that usually requires one to apply to become a member. Such clubs may be dedicated to particular activities: sporting clubs, for example.
- Cabal: A group of people united in some close design together, usually to promote their private views or interests in a church, state, or other community, often by intrigue.
- Community: A group of people with a commonality or sometimes a complex net of overlapping commonalities, often—but not always—in proximity with one another with some degree of continuity over time.
- Gang: Usually an urban group that gathers in a particular area. It is a group of people that often hang around each other. They can be like some clubs, but much less formal. They are usually known in many countries to cause social unrest and also have negative influence on the members and may be a target for the law enforcers in case of any social vices.
- Mob: Typically a group of people that has taken the law into their own hands. Mobs are usually groups which gather temporarily for a particular reason.
- Posse: Originally found in English common law, posses are generally obsolete and survive only in the United States, where they are the law enforcement equivalent of summoning the militia for military purposes. However, posse can also refer to a street group.
- Squad: Generally a small group, of around 3 to 15 people, who work as a team to accomplish their goals.
- Team: Similar to a squad, though a team may contain many more members. A team works in a similar way to a squad.

== See also ==
- Fandom
- Gemeinschaft and Gesellschaft
- Group dynamics
- Social complexity
- Social group
- Social network
