= Affluence in the United States =

Economical and financial advantage

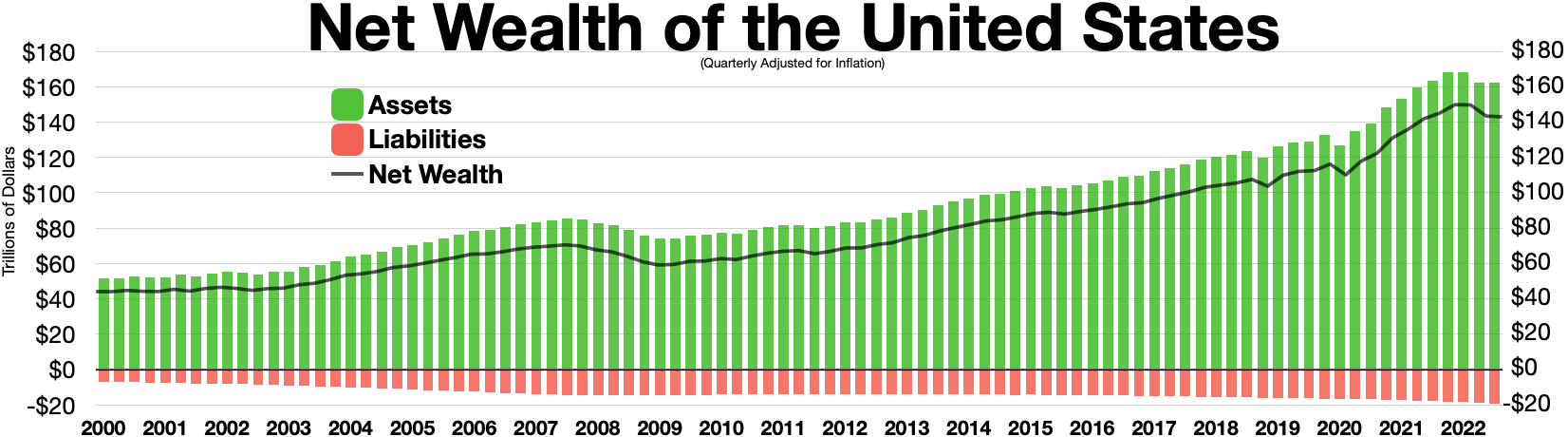
Net Wealth of the United States Assets Net Wealth Liabilities

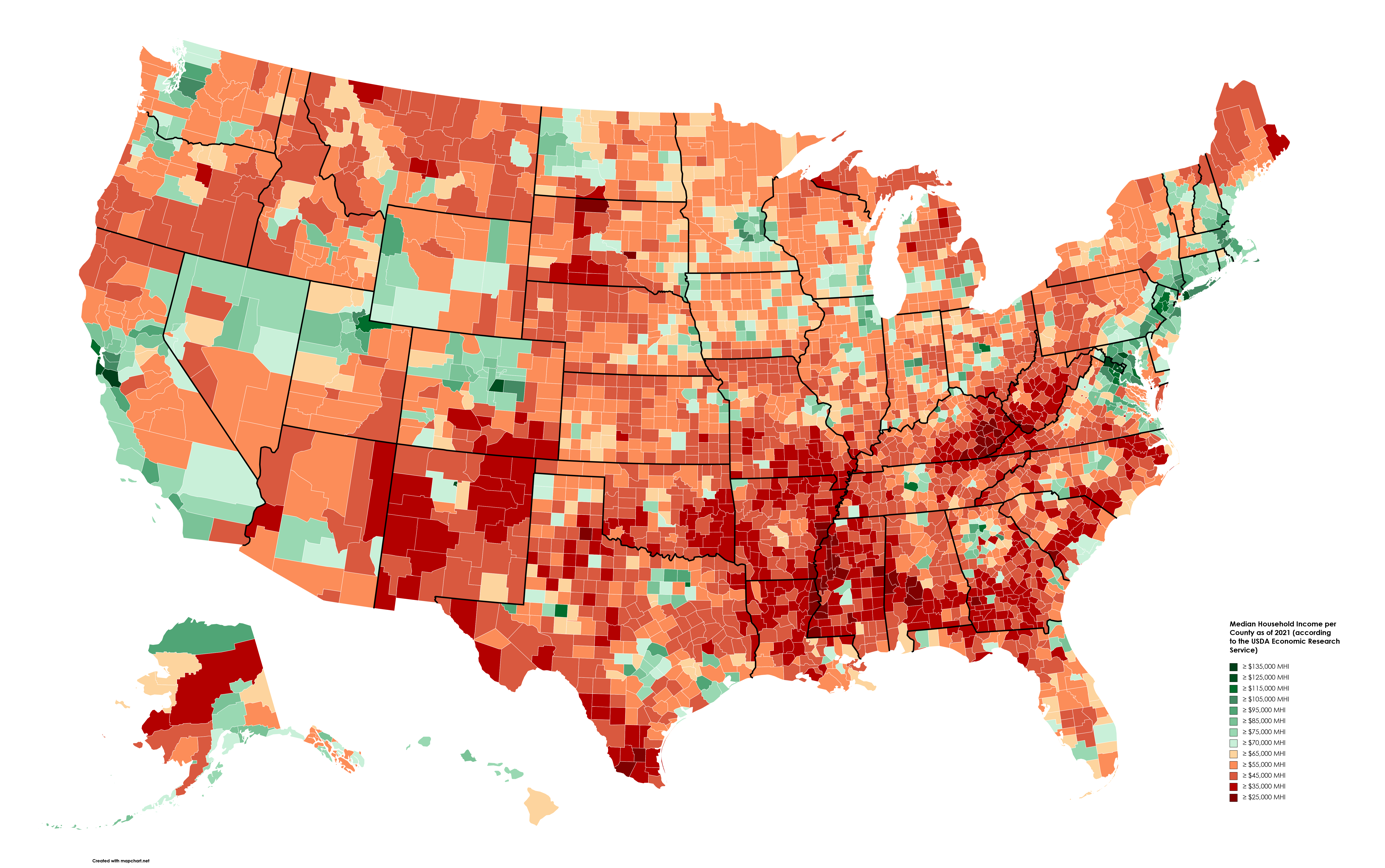
Median U.S. household income per County in 2021, showing the distribution of income geographically in the United States

Affluence refers to an individual's or household's economical and financial advantage in comparison to others. It may be assessed through either income or wealth.

In absolute terms, affluence is a relatively widespread phenomenon in the United States, with over 30% of households having an income exceeding $100,000 per year and over 30% of households having a net worth exceeding $250,000, as of 2019. However, when looked at in relative terms, wealth is highly concentrated: the bottom 50% of Americans only share 2% of the total household wealth, while the top 1% hold 35% of that wealth.

In 2022, the median net worth of U.S. families was $192,900 and the mean was $1,063,700, measured in 2022 dollars. Between 2019 and 2022, real median family net worth rose 37 percent and real mean net worth rose 23 percent.

== Income vs. wealth ==
Annual income and accumulated net worth, by age

Annual income of U.S. families is near its highest throughout the 35-64 age group.

Accumulated net worth of U.S. families peaks in the 65-74 year age group.

Values of transaction accounts—those with immediate "on-demand" access—vary across age groups. Average account values are skewed upward by a small number of high-balance accounts. Median balances in transaction accounts better indicate readily available funds.

While income is often seen as a type of wealth in colloquial language use, wealth and income are two substantially different measures of economic prosperity. Wealth is the total value of net possessions of an individual or household, while income is the total inflow of monetary assets over a given time period. Hence the change in wealth over that time period is equal to the income minus the expenditures in that period. Income is a so-called "flow" variable, while wealth is a so-called "stock" variable.

== Income as a metric ==
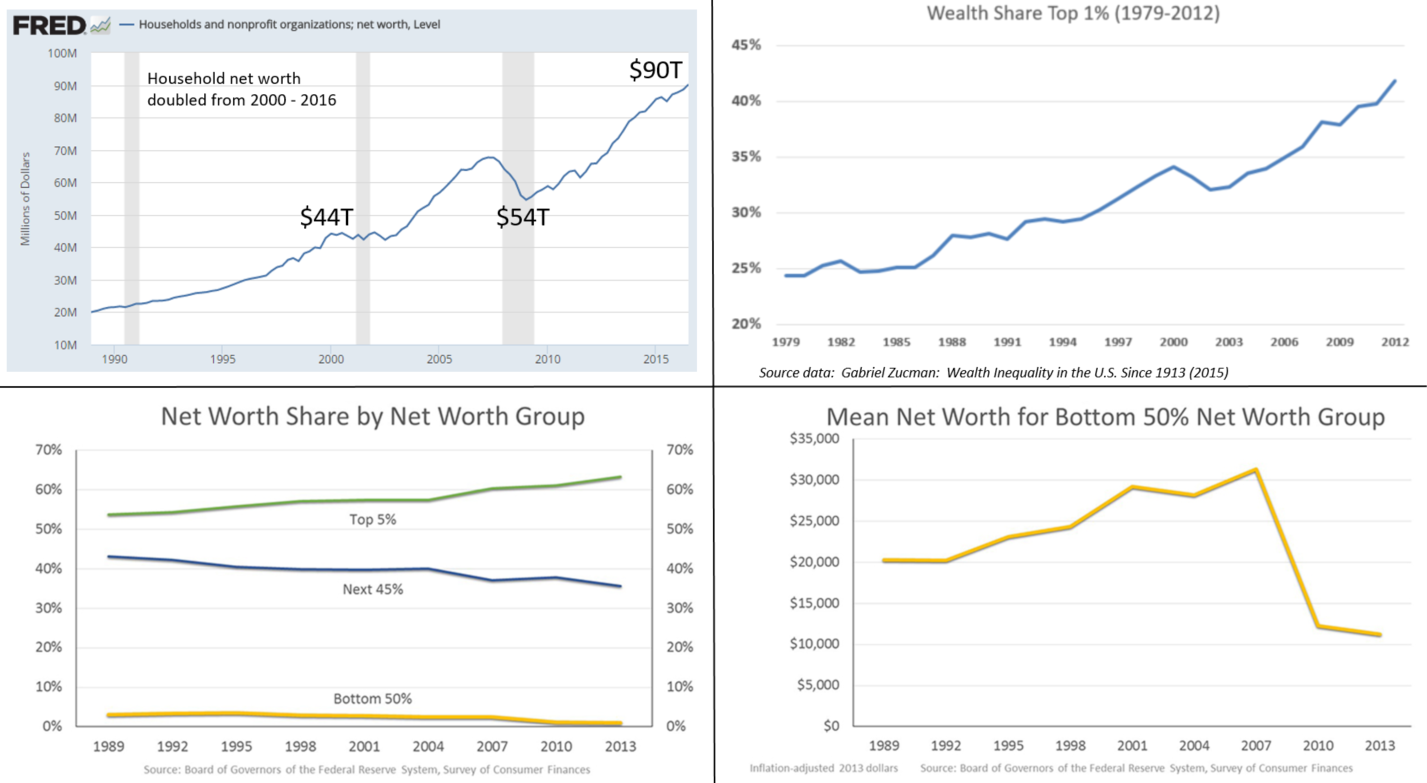
The image contains several charts related to U.S. wealth inequality. While U.S. net worth roughly doubled from 2000 to 2016, the gains went primarily to the wealthy.

Affluence in the United States has been attributed in many cases to inherited wealth amounting to "a substantial head start": in September 2012, the Institute for Policy Studies found that over 60 percent of the Forbes richest 400 Americans had grown up in the top 5% of households.

Income is commonly used to measure affluence, although this is a relative indicator: a middle class person with a personal income of $77,500 annually and a billionaire may both be referred to as affluent, depending on reference groups. An average American with a median income of $32,000 ($39,000 for those employed full-time between the ages of 25 and 64) when used as a reference group would justify the personal income in the tenth percentile of $77,500 being described as affluent, but if this earner were compared to an executive of a Fortune 500 company, then the description would not apply. Accordingly, marketing firms and investment houses classify those with household incomes exceeding $250,000 as mass affluent, while the threshold upper class is most commonly defined as the top 1% with household incomes commonly exceeding $525,000 annually.

According to the U.S. Census Bureau, 42% of U.S. households have two income earners, thus making households' income levels higher than personal income levels; the percent of married-couple families with children where both parents work is 59.1%.

In 2005, the economic survey revealed the following income distribution for households and individuals:

- The top 5% of individuals had six-figure incomes (exceeding $100,000); the top 10% of individuals had incomes exceeding $75,000;
- The top 5% of households, three quarters of whom had two income earners, had incomes of $166,200 (about 10 times the 2009 US minimum wage, for one income earner, and about 5 times the 2009 US minimum wage for two income earners) or higher, with the top 10% having incomes well in excess of $100,000.
- The top 0.12% of households had incomes exceeding $1,600,000 annually.

Households may also be differentiated among each other, depending on whether or not they have one or multiple income earners (the high female participation in the economy means that many households have two working members). For example, in 2005 the median household income for a two income earner households was $67,000 while the median income for an individual employed full-time with a graduate degree was in excess of $60,000, demonstrating that nearly half of individuals with a graduate degree have earnings comparable with most dual income households.

Overall, the term affluent may be applied to a variety of individuals, households, or other entities, depending on context. Data from the U.S. Census Bureau serves as the main guideline for defining affluence. U.S. government data not only reveal the nation's income distribution but also the demographic characteristics of those to whom the term "affluent", may be applied.

== Wealth ==
Wealth in the United States is commonly measured in terms of net worth, which is the sum of all assets, including the market value of real estate, like a home, minus all liabilities. The United States is the wealthiest country in the world.

For example, a household in possession of an $800,000 house, $5,000 in mutual funds, $30,000 in cars, $20,000 worth of stock in their own company, and a $45,000 IRA would have assets totaling $900,000. Assuming that this household would have a $250,000 mortgage, $40,000 in car loans, and $10,000 in credit card debt, its debts would total $300,000. Subtracting the debts from the worth of this household's assets (900,000 − $300,000 = $600,000), this household would have a net worth of $600,000. Net worth can vary with fluctuations in value of the underlying assets.

As one would expect, households with greater income often have the highest net worths, though high income cannot be taken as an always accurate indicator of net worth. Overall the number of wealthier households is on the rise, with baby boomers hitting the highs of their careers. In addition, wealth is unevenly distributed, with the wealthiest 25% of US households owning 87% of the wealth in the United States, which was $54.2 trillion in 2009.

U.S. household and non-profit organization net worth rose from $44.2 trillion in Q1 2000 to a pre-recession peak of $67.7 trillion in Q3 2007. It then fell $13.1 trillion to $54.6 trillion in Q1 2009 due to the subprime mortgage crisis. It then recovered, rising consistently to $86.8 trillion by Q4 2015. This is nearly double the 2000 level.

=== Mechanisms to gain wealth ===
Assets are known as the raw materials of wealth. They include stocks, bonds, private companies, and real estate including homeownership. While tangible assets are unequally distributed, financial assets are much more unequal.

These discrepancies exist because the many wealth building tools established by the Federal Government work better for high earners. These include 401k plans, 403b plans, and IRAs. Traditional IRAs, 401k and 403b plans are tax shelters created for working individuals. These plans allow for tax sheltered (or pre-tax) contributions of earned income directly to tax sheltered savings accounts. Annual contributions are capped to ensure that high earners cannot enjoy the tax benefit disproportionately. The Roth IRA is another tool that can help create wealth in the working and middle classes.

Assets in Roth IRAs grow tax free; interests, dividends, and capital gains are all exempt from income taxes. Contributions to Roth IRAs are limited to those with annual incomes less than the threshold established yearly by the IRS, though this can easily and legally be circumvented by those with incomes past the threshold. The benefits of these plans, however, are only available to workers and families whose incomes and expenses allow them excess funds to commit for a long period, typically until the investor reaches age 59½. The effect of these tools are further limited by the contribution limits placed on them.

Including human capital such as skills, the United Nations International Human Dimensions Programme estimated the total wealth of the United States in 2008 to be $118 trillion.

== Top percentiles of income ==
Affluence and economic standing within society are often expressed in terms of percentile ranking. The economic ranking is conducted either in terms of giving lower thresholds for a designated group (e.g. the top 5%, 10%, 15%, etc.) or in terms of the percentage of households/individuals with incomes above a certain threshold (e.g. above $75,000, $100,000, $200,000, etc.).

=== Household income over time ===
Household income changes over time, with income gains being substantially larger for the upper percentiles than for the lower percentiles. All areas of the income strata have seen their incomes rise since the late 1960s, especially during the late 1990s.

Two income-earner households are more common among the top quintile of households than the general population: 2006 U.S. Census Bureau data indicates that over three quarters, 76%, of households in the top quintile, with annual incomes exceeding $91,200, had two or more income earners compared to just 42% among the general population and a small minority in the bottom three quintiles. As a result, much of the rising income inequity between the upper and lower percentiles can be explained through the increasing percentage of households with two or more incomes.

Data	2003	2000	1997	1994	1991	1988	1985	1982	1979	1976	1973	1970	1967
20th percentile	$17,984	$19,142	$17,601	$16,484	$16,580	$17,006	$16,306	$15,548	$16,457	$15,615	$15,844	$15,126	$14,002
Median (50th)	$43,318	$44,853	$42,294	$39,613	$39,679	$40,678	$38,510	$36,811	$38,649	$36,155	$37,700	$35,832	$33,338
80th percentile	$86,867	$87,341	$81,719	$77,154	$74,759	$75,593	$71,433	$66,920	$68,318	$63,247	$64,500	$60,148	$55,265
95th percentile	$154,120	$155,121	$144,636	$134,835	$126,969	$127,958	$119,459	$111,516	$111,445	$100,839	$102,243	$95,090	$88,678

Source: U.S. Census Bureau (2004): "Income, Poverty, and Health Insurance Coverage in the United States: 2003", p. 36 et seq. All figures are inflation-adjusted and given in 2003 dollars.

==== Income distribution over time ====
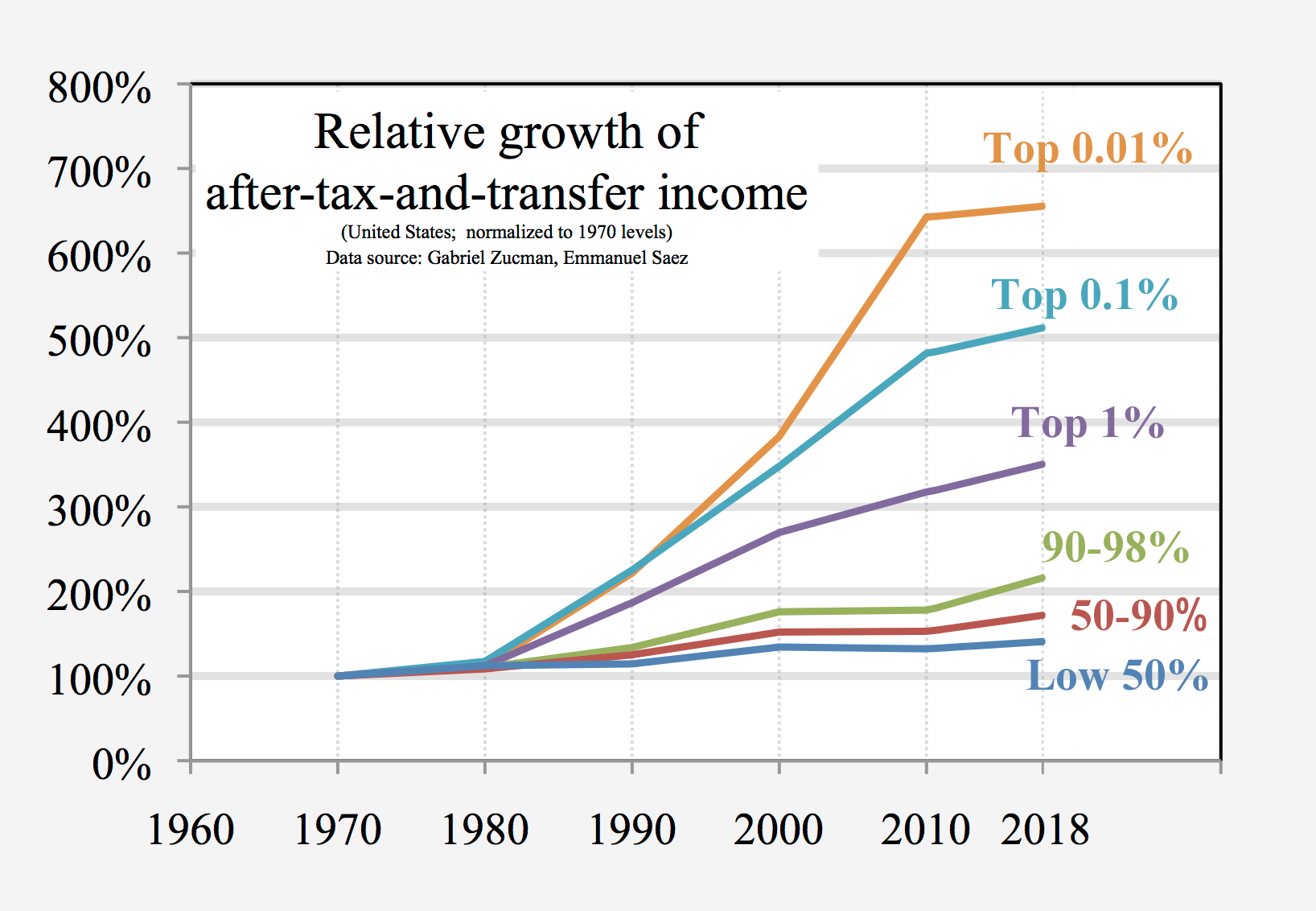
Both income growth and the decline in the progressivity of the tax code for the wealthy affect income, with the wealthiest earners seeing their effective tax rates decline.

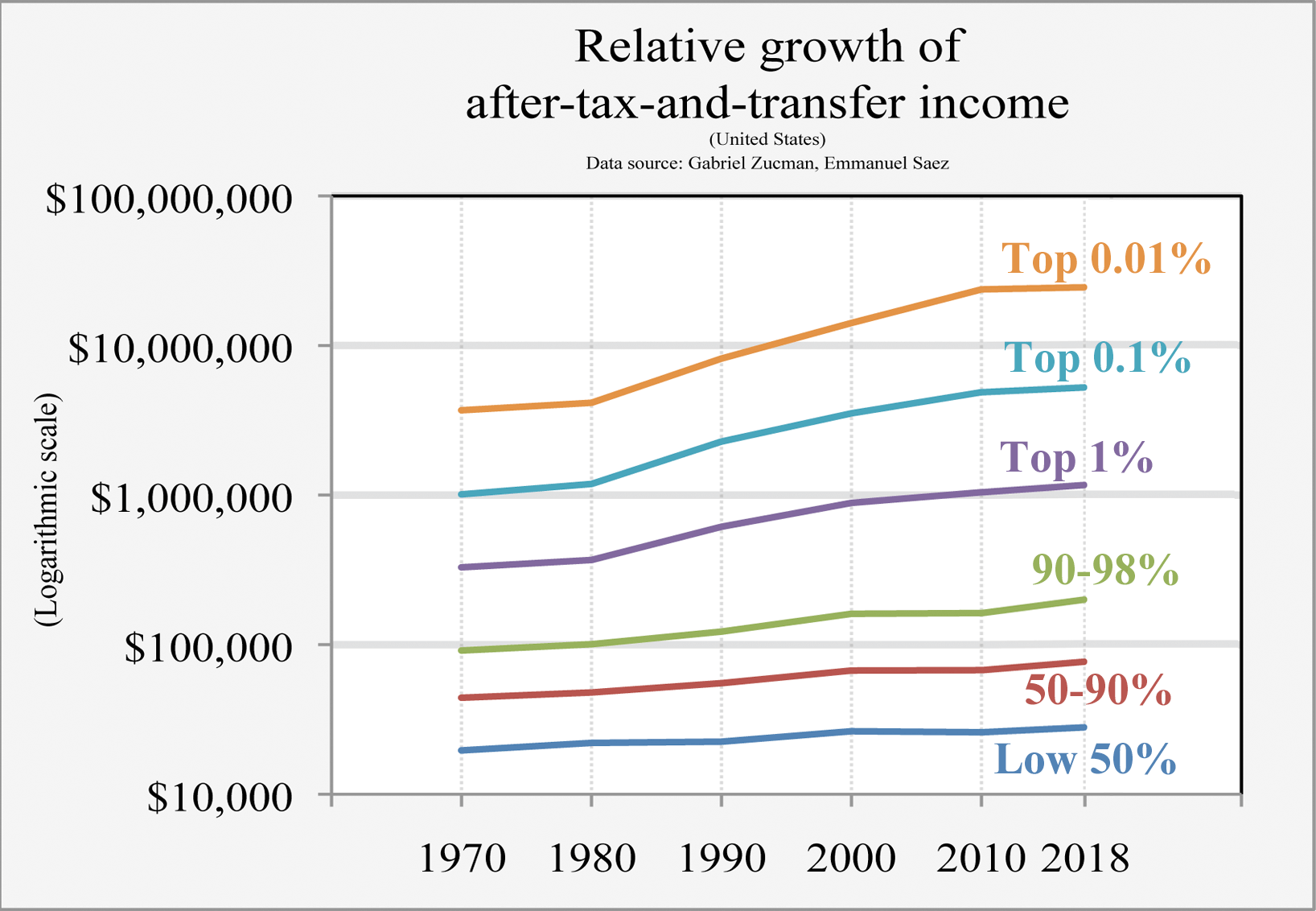
Same data as adjacent chart, but plotted on logarithmic scale to show absolute dollar amounts.

Total effective tax rates (includes all taxes: federal+state income tax, sales tax, property tax, etc.) for the richest Americans declined by 2018 to a level beneath that of the bottom 50% of earners, contributing to wealth inequality. Analysis by economists Emmanuel Saez and Gabriel Zucman.

According to the Congressional Budget Office, between 1979 and 2007 incomes of the top 1% of Americans grew by an average of 275%. During the same time period, the 60% of Americans in the middle of the income scale saw their income rise by 40%. From 1992 to 2007 the top 400 income earners in the U.S. saw their income increase 392% and their average tax rate reduced by 37%. In 2009, the average income of the top 1% was $960,000 with a minimum income of $343,927.

During the economic expansion between 2002 and 2007, the income of the top 1% grew 10 times faster than the income of the bottom 90%. In this period 66% of total income gains went to the 1%, who in 2007 had a larger share of total income than at any time since 1928. According to PolitiFact and others, the top 400 wealthiest Americans "have more wealth than half of all Americans combined." Inherited wealth may help explain why many Americans who have become rich may have had a "substantial head start". In September 2012, according to the Institute for Policy Studies, "over 60 percent" of the Forbes richest 400 Americans "grew up in substantial privilege".

If a family has a positive net worth then it has more wealth than the combined net worth of over 30.6 million American families. This is because the bottom 25% of American families have a negative combined net worth.

=== Complications in interpreting income statistics ===
Many people look only at annual reported income data split into income quintiles. It is erroneous to assume that individual households remain in the same quintile over time, just as it usually is when using aggregate data. A majority of households in the top income quintile in one year, for example, will have moved to a lower quintile within a decade. Three out of four households in the top 0.01% of income will no longer be in that small group ten years later. In summary, half of all of U.S. households move from one income quintile to a different income quintile every decade. And actual households who started a decade in the lowest quintile of income, when tracked over the next ten years, will have proportionally more income growth than actual households who started the decade in the highest quintile of income. Thus, when comparing income/wealth quintile distributions from different time periods, generalizations can only be made with regards to the households in aggregate for each quintile, and can not be made to any individual households over the same time period (i.e. assuming the wealth value has been appropriately adjusted for differences in time, one cannot infer that a decrease in total wealth percentage for one quintile over time means that the households from that quintile have lost wealth as individuals, but only that total wealth percentage has decreased for those in that quintile at the time of measurement).

Top 20% income vs. the bottom 20% income households:

1. The average number of people with jobs in a top income quintile household is two, while a majority of bottom-income-quintile households have no-one employed.
2. If there are two adult income earners in a household who are married, their incomes are combined on tax forms. This is very common among top-quintile-income households. The lowest-quintile households, however, include a lot more single-person households, or two unmarried working adults living together and sharing expenses, but reporting their incomes to the IRS as if they were two separate households.
3. 75%...80% of actual income for bottom-quintile-households consists of specific transfer payments from social or relief programs (aka "welfare" and other benefits), which payments are not included in IRS data as income. The top income quintile gets a very small percentage of their actual income from transfer payments.
4. The IRS warns against comparisons of pre-1987 and post-1987 income data due to significant changes in the definition of adjusted gross income (AGI) that made top-quintile households appear to have large reported income gains, when in fact there was no change to their income at all. In addition to AGI changes, large marginal tax rate reductions during the Reagan Administration caused another large change in tax reporting. A lot of corporate income formerly reported on corporate tax returns was switched to lower-tax-rate individual tax returns (as Subchapter S corporations). This reporting change appeared to boost top-quintile income, when in fact their incomes had not changed. As a result, the top income quintile for households today includes a lot of corporate income previously reported in corporate tax returns, while Subchapter S corporations that lose money, are likely to be included in the bottom-income-quintile households. Income comparisons that compare pre-1987 to post-1987 income, are very common, but they are also biased, according to the IRS, and should be ignored.

Impact of age and experience: people that are older and have more experience, tend to have considerably larger incomes than younger and inexperienced workers. Normalizing for age and experience is rarely an effective statistical compensation, as each elderly citizen began as inexperienced.

=== Median income levels ===
Median household income by selected characteristics
Type of household			Race and Hispanic origin				Region			
All households	Family households	Nonfamily households	Asian	Non-Hispanic White	Hispanic (of any race)	Black	Northeast	Midwest	South	West
$70,784	$91,162	$41,797	$101,418	$77,999	$57,981	$48,297	$77,422	$71,129	$63,368	$79,430

Median household income by selected characteristics cont.
Age of Householder		Nativity of Householder		Metropolitan Statistical Area (MSA) Status		Educational Attainment of Householder*			
Under 65 years	65 years and older	Native-born	Foreign-born	Inside MSA	Outside MSA	No HS diploma	HS, no college	Some college	Bachelor min
$80,734	$47,620	$71,522	$66,043	$73,823	$53,750	$30,378	$50,401	$64,378	$115,456
*Householders aged 25 and older. In 2021, the median household income for this group was $72,046.

Median earnings by work status and sex (Persons, aged 15 years and older with earnings)
Total workers			Full-Time, year-round workers		
Both sexes	Male	Female	Both sexes	Male	Female
$45,470	$50,983	$39,201	$56,473	$61,180	$51,226

2020 Median earnings & household income by educational attainment
Measure	Overall	< 9th grade	Some HS	HS grad	Some college	Associate	Bachelor or more	Bachelor	Master	Professional	Doctorate
Persons, age 25+ w/ earnings*	$46,985	$25,162	$26,092	$34,540	$39,362	$42,391	$66,423	$60,705	$71,851	$102,741	$101,526
Male, age 25+ w/ earnings*	$52,298	$30,089	$31,097	$40,852	$47,706	$52,450	$80,192	$71,666	$91,141	$126,584	$121,956
Female, age 25+ w/ earnings*	$40,392	$18,588	$19,504	$27,320	$31,837	$36,298	$57,355	$51,154	$62,522	$92,780	$85,551
Persons, age 25+, employed full-time	$59,371	$33,945	$34,897	$42,417	$50,640	$52,285	$77,105	$71,283	$82,183	$130,466	$119,552
Household	$69,228	$29,609	$29,520	$47,405	$60,392	$68,769	$106,936	$100,128	$114,900	$151,560	$142,493
*Total work experience

Household income distribution
10th percentile	20th percentile	30th percentile	40th percentile	50th percentile	60th percentile	70th percentile	80th percentile	90th percentile	95th percentile
≤ $15,700	≤ $28,000	≤ $40,500	≤ $55,000	$70,800	≤ $89,700	≤ $113,200	≤ $149,100	≤ $212,100	≤ $286,300
Source: US Census Bureau, 2021; income statistics for the year 2021

== Wealth distribution ==
Net personal wealth in the U.S. since 1962

The average personal wealth of people in the top 1% is more than a thousand times that of people in bottom 50%.

The logarithmic scale shows how wealth has increased for all percentile groups, though moreso for wealthier people.

Though the 10th percentile of American households have zero net worth, the 90th percentile has $1.8 million of household wealth.

Median wealth of married couples exceeds that of single individuals, regardless of gender and across all age categories.

According to an analysis that excludes pensions and social security, the richest 1% of the American population in 2007 owned 34.6% of the country's total wealth, and the next 19% owned 50.5%. Thus, the top 20% of Americans owned 85% of the country's wealth and the bottom 80% of the population owned 15%. Financial inequality was greater than inequality in total wealth, with the top 1% of the population owning 42.7%, the next 19% of Americans owning 50.3%, and the bottom 80% owning 7%. However, according to the federal reserve, "For most households, pensions and Social Security are the most important sources of income during retirement, and the promised benefit stream constitutes a sizable fraction of household wealth" and "including pensions and Social Security in net worth makes the distribution more even". When including household wealth from pensions and social security, the richest 1% of the American population in 1992 owned 16% of the country's total wealth, as opposed to 32% when excluding pensions and social security.

After the Great Recession which started in 2007, the share of total wealth owned by the top 1% of the population grew from 34.6% to 37.1%, and that owned by the top 20% of Americans grew from 85% to 87.7%. The Great Recession also caused a drop of 36.1% in median household wealth but a drop of only 11.1% for the top 1%.

=== Income inequality ===
Income and wealth, by educational level (US)

Median annual salaries across educational levels varied by a factor of about 3.

Median accumulated household wealth across educational levels varied by a factor of over 50.

Economists and related experts have described America's growing income inequality as "deeply worrying", unjust, a danger to democracy/social stability, and a sign of national decline. Yale professor Robert Shiller, who was among three Americans who won the Nobel prize for economics in 2013, said after receiving the award, "The most important problem that we are facing now today, I think, is rising inequality in the United States and elsewhere in the world."

== Changes in wealth ==
=== 1989–2001 ===
When observing the changes in the wealth among American households, one can note an increase in wealthier individuals and a decrease in the number of poor households, while net worth increased most substantially in semi-wealthy and wealthy households. Overall the percentage of households with a negative net worth (more debt than assets) declined from 9.5% in 1989 to 4.1% in 2001.

The percentage of net worths ranging from $500,000 to one million doubled while the percentage of millionaires tripled. From 1995 to 2004, there was tremendous growth among household wealth, as it nearly doubled from $21.9 trillion to $43.6 trillion, but the wealthiest quartile of the economic distribution made up 89% of this growth. During this time frame, wealth became increasingly unequal, and the wealthiest 25% became even wealthier.

According to U.S. Census Bureau statistics, this 'upward shift' is most likely the result of a booming housing market which caused homeowners to experience tremendous increases in home equity. Life-cycles have also attributed to the rising wealth among Americans. With more and more baby-boomers reaching the climax of their careers and the middle-aged population making up a larger segment of the population now than ever before, more and more households have achieved comfortable levels of wealth. Zhu Xiao Di (2004) notes, that household wealth usually peaks around families headed by people in their 50s, and as a result, the baby boomer generation reached this age range at the time of the analysis.

=== After 2007 ===
In 2025, the top 1% of Americans by wealth owned nearly 50% of the stock market. The top 10% own 87.2%, and the bottom half owned 1.1%.

Household net worth fell from 2007 to 2009 by a total of $17.5 trillion or 25.5%. This was the equivalent loss of one year of GDP. By the fourth quarter of 2010, the household net worth had recovered by a growth of 1.3 percent to a total of $56.8 trillion. An additional growth of 15.7 percent is needed just to bring the value to where it was before the recession started in December 2007. In 2014 a record breaking net worth of $80.7 trillion was achieved.

The income disparities even within the top 1.5% are quite drastic. While households in the top 1.5% of households had incomes exceeding $250,000, 443% above the national median, their incomes were still 2200% lower than those of the top 0.1% of households.

== Occupations ==
Top-earning professions include medicine, dentistry, law, engineering, finance, and corporate executive management. A correlation has been shown between increases in income and increases in worker satisfaction. Increasing worker satisfaction, however, is not solely a result of the increase in income: workers in more complex and higher level occupations tend to have attained higher levels of education and thus are more likely to have a greater degree of autonomy in the workplace. Additionally, higher level workers with advanced degrees are hired to share their personal knowledge, to conceptualize, and to consult. Higher-level workers typically suffer less job alienation and reap not only external benefits in terms of income from their jobs, but also enjoy high levels of intrinsic motivation and satisfaction.

In the United States, the highest earning occupational group is referred to as white collar professionals. Individuals in this occupational classification tend to report the highest job satisfaction and highest incomes. Defining income based on title of a profession can be misleading, given that a professional title may indicate the type of education received, but does not always correlate with the actual day to day income-generating endeavors that are pursued.

Some sources cite the profession of physician in the United States as the highest paying, Physician (MD and DO) and Dentist (DMD and DDS) compensation ranks as the highest median annual earnings of all professions. Median annual earnings ranged from $149,310 for general dentists and $156,010 for family physicians to $321,686 for anesthesiologists. Surgeons post a median annual income of $282,504. However, the annual salary for chief executive officer (C.E.O.) is projected quite differently based on source: Salary.com reports a median salary of $634,941, while the U.S. Department of Labor in May 2004 reported the median as $140,350. This is primarily due to a methodological difference in terms of which companies were surveyed. Overall annual earnings among the nation's top 25 professions ranged from the $70,000s to the $300,000s.

In addition to physicians, lawyers, physicists, and nuclear engineers were all among the nation's 20 highest paid occupations with incomes in excess of $78,410. Some of the other occupations in the high five-figure range were economists with a median of $72,780, mathematicians with $81,240, financial managers with $81,880, and software publishers with median annual earnings of $73,060. The median annual earnings of wage-and-salary pharmacists in May 2006 were $94,520. The median annual earnings of wage-and-salary engineers in November 2011 were $90,000. The middle 50 percent earned between $83,180 and $108,140 a year (as in the Occupational Outlook Handbook, 2008–09 Edition by the U.S. Bureau of Labor Statistics).

== Education ==
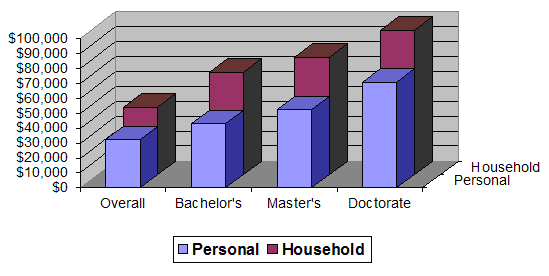
Median household and personal income by educational attainment

Ivy-Plus admissions rates vary with the income of the students' parents, with the acceptance rate of the top 0.1% income percentile being almost twice as much as other students.

Educational attainment plays a major factor in determining an individual's economic disposition. Personal income varied greatly according to an individual's education, as did household income.

Incomes for those employed, full-time, year-round and over the age of twenty-five ranged from $20,826 ($17,422 if including those who worked part-time) for those with less than a ninth grade education to $100,000 for those with professional degrees ($82,473 if including those who work part-time). The median income for individuals with doctorates was $79,401 ($70,853 if including those who work part-time).

These statistics reveal that the majority of those employed full-time with professional or doctoral degrees are among the overall top 10% (15% if including those who work part-time) of income earners. Of those with a master's degree, nearly 50% were among the top quarter of income earners (top third if including those who work part-time).

== Religion ==
Individuals of a broad variety of religious backgrounds have become wealthy in America. However, the majority of these individuals follow Mainline Protestant denominations; Episcopalians and Presbyterians are most prevalent. According to a 2016 study by the Pew Research Center, Jewish again ranked as the most financially successful religious group in the United States, with 44% of Jews living in households with incomes of at least $100,000, followed by Hindu (36%), Episcopalians (35%), and Presbyterians (32%). Owing to their numbers, more Catholics (13.3 million) reside in households with a yearly income of $100,000 or more than any other religious group.

According to the same study there is a correlation between education and income, about 77% of American Hindus have an undergraduate degree and according to a study in 2020, they are earning the highest with median income $137,000, followed by Jews (59%), Episcopalians (56%), and Presbyterians (47%).

== Race ==
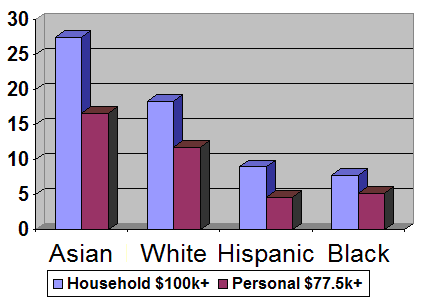
Percent of households with six figure incomes and individuals with incomes in the top 10%, exceeding $77,500

Recent U.S. Census Bureau publications indicate a strong correlation between race and affluence. In the top household income quintile (households with incomes exceeding $91,200), Asian Americans and Whites were over represented, whereas Hispanics and African Americans were underrepresented.

In 2006, the household income for Asian Americans was, at $61,094, by far the highest, exceeding that of Whites ($48,554) by 26%. Over a quarter, 27.5%, of Asian American households had incomes exceeding $100,000, and another 40% had incomes of over $75,000.

Among White households, who remained near the national median, 18.3% had six figure incomes, while 28.9% had incomes exceeding $75,000. The percentages of households with incomes exceeding $100,000 and $75,000 were far below the national medians for Hispanic and African American households. Among Hispanic households, for example, only 9% had six figure incomes, and 17% had incomes exceeding $75,000. The race gap remained when considering personal income. In 2005, roughly 11% of Asian Americans and 7% of White individuals had six figure incomes, compared to 2.6% among Hispanics and 2.3% among African Americans.

The racial breakdowns of income brackets further illustrate the racial disparities associated with affluence. in 2005, 81.8% of all 114 million households were White (including White Hispanics), 12.2% were African American, 10.9% were Hispanic and 3.7% were Asian American.

While White households are always near the national median due to Whites being by far the most prevalent racial demographic, the percentages of minority households with incomes exceeding $100,000 strayed considerably from their percentage of the overall population: Asian Americans, who represent the smallest surveyed racial demographic in the overall population, were found to be the prevalent minority among six figure income households.

Among the nearly twenty million households with six figure incomes, 86.9% were White, 5.9% were Asian American, 5.6% were Hispanic and 5.5% were African American. Among the general individual population with earnings, 82.1% were White, 12.7% were Hispanic, 11.0% were African American and 4.6% were Asian American.

Of the top 10% of income earners, those nearly 15 million individuals with incomes exceeding $77,500, Whites and Asians were once again over-represented with the percentages of African Americans and Hispanics trailing behind considerably. Of the top 10% of earners, 86.7% were White. Asian Americans were the prevalent minority, constituting 6.8% of top 10% income earners, nearly twice the percentage of Asian Americans among the general population.

Hispanics, who were the prevalent minority in the general population of income earners, constituted only 5.2% of those in the top 10%, with African Americans being the least represented with 5.1%.

Race		Overall median	High school	Some college	College graduate	Bachelor's degree	Master's degree	Doctoral degree
Total population	All, age 25+	32,140	26,505	31,054	49,303	43,143	52,390	70,853
Total population	Full-time workers, age 25–64	39,509	31,610	37,150	56,027	50,959	61,324	79,292
White alone	All, age 25+	33,030	27,311	31,564	49,972	43,833	52,318	71,268
White alone	Full-time workers, age 25–64	40,422	32,427	38,481	56,903	51,543	61,441	77,906
Asian alone	All, age 25+	36,152	25,285	29,982	51,481	42,466	61,452	69,653
Asian alone	Full-time workers, age 25–64	42,109	27,041	33,120	60,532	51,040	71,316	91,430
African American	All, age 25+	27,101	22,379	27,648	44,534	41,572	48,266	61,894
African American	Full-time workers, age 25–64	32,021	26,230	32,392	47,758	45,505	52,858	N/A
Hispanic or Latino	All, age 25+	23,613	22,941	28,698	41,596	37,819	50,901	67,274
Hispanic or Latino	Full-time workers, age 25–64	27,266	26,461	33,120	46,594	41,831	53,880	N/A

Source: U.S. Census Bureau, 2006

Indian Americans are the top earning ethnic group.

== Status and stratification ==
Economic well-being is often associated with high societal status, yet income and economic compensation are a function of scarcity and act as only one of a number of indicators of social class. It is in the interest of all of society that open positions are adequately filled with a competent occupant enticed to do his or her best. As a result, an occupation that requires a scarce skill, the attainment of which is often documented through an educational degree, and entrusts its occupant with a high degree of influence will generally offer high economic compensation.

To put it another way, the high income is intended to ensure that the desired individuals obtain the necessary skills (e.g. medical or graduate school) and complete their tasks with the necessary vigor but differences in income may, however, be found among occupations of similar sociological nature: the median annual earnings of a physician were in excess of $150,000 in May 2004, compared to $95,000 for an attorney. Both occupations require finely tuned and scarce skill sets and both are essential to the well-being of society, yet physicians out-earned attorneys and other upper middle class professionals by a wide margin as their skill-sets are deemed especially scarce.

Overall, high status positions tend to be those requiring a scarce skill and are therefore commonly far better compensated than those in the middle of the occupational strata.

...It is essential that the duties of the positions be performed with the diligence that their importance requires. Inevitably, then, a society must have, first, some kind of rewards that it can use as inducements, and, second, some way of distributing these rewards differently according to positions. The rewards and their distribution become part of the social order... If the rights and perquisites of different positions in a society must be unequal, then society must be stratified... Hence every society... must differentiate persons... and must therefore possess a certain amount of institutionalized inequality.

— Kingsley Davis & Wilbert E. Moore, "Some Principles of Stratification", republished in Social Class and Stratification

The above is an ideal type, a simplified model of reality using optimal circumstances. In reality other factors such as discrimination based on race, ethnicity and gender as well as aggressive political lobbying by certain professional organizations also influence personal income. An individual's personal career decisions, as well as his or her personal connections within the nation's economic institutions, are also likely to have an effect on income, status and whether or not an individual may be referred to as affluent.

In contemporary America it is a combination of all these factors, with scarcity remaining by far the most prominent one, which determine a person's economic compensation. Due to higher status professions requiring advanced and thus less commonly found skill sets (including the ability to supervise and work with a considerable autonomy), these professions are better compensated through the means of income, making high status individuals affluent, depending on reference group.

While the two paragraphs above only describe the relationship between status and personal income, household income is also often used to infer status. As a result, the dual income phenomenon presents yet another problem in equating affluence with high societal status. As mentioned earlier in the article, 42% of households have two or more income earners, and 76% of households with six figure incomes have two or more income earners. Furthermore, people are most likely to marry their professional and societal equals.

It therefore becomes apparent that the majority of households with incomes exceeding the six figure mark are the result of an economic as well as personal union between two economic equals. Today, two nurses, each making $55,000 a year, can easily out-earn a single attorney who makes the median of $95,000 annually. Despite household income rising drastically through the union of two economic equals, neither individual has advanced his or her function and position within society. Yet the household (not the individual) may have become more affluent, assuming an increase in household members does not offset the dual-income derived gains.

Academic class models
Dennis Gilbert, 2002		William Thompson & Joseph Hickey, 2005		Leonard Beeghley, 2004	
Class	Typical characteristics	Class	Typical characteristics	Class	Typical characteristics
Capitalist class (1%)	Top-level executives, high-rung politicians, heirs. Ivy League education common.	Upper class (1%)	Top-level executives, celebrities, heirs; income of $500,000+ common. Ivy League education common.	The super-rich (0.9%)	Multi-millionaires whose incomes commonly exceed $3.5 million or more; includes celebrities and powerful executives/politicians. Ivy League education common.
Upper middle class^{[1]} (15%)	Highly-educated (often with graduate degrees), most commonly salaried, professionals and middle management with large work autonomy.	Upper middle class^{[1]} (15%)	Highly-educated (often with graduate degrees) professionals & managers with household incomes varying from the high 5-figure range to commonly above $100,000.	The rich (5%)	Households with net worth of $1 million or more; largely in the form of home equity. Generally have college degrees.
Upper middle class^{[1]} (15%)	Highly-educated (often with graduate degrees), most commonly salaried, professionals and middle management with large work autonomy.	Upper middle class^{[1]} (15%)	Highly-educated (often with graduate degrees) professionals & managers with household incomes varying from the high 5-figure range to commonly above $100,000.	Middle class (plurality/ majority?; ca. 46%)	College-educated workers with considerably higher-than-average incomes and compensation; a man making $57,000 and a woman making $40,000 may be typical.
Lower middle class (30%)	Semi-professionals and craftsmen with a roughly average standard of living. Most have some college education and are white-collar.	Lower middle class (32%)	Semi-professionals and craftsmen with some work autonomy; household incomes commonly range from $35,000 to $75,000. Typically, some college education.	Middle class (plurality/ majority?; ca. 46%)	College-educated workers with considerably higher-than-average incomes and compensation; a man making $57,000 and a woman making $40,000 may be typical.
Working class (30%)	Clerical and most blue-collar workers whose work is highly routinized. Standard of living varies depending on number of income earners, but is commonly just adequate. High school education.	Lower middle class (32%)	Semi-professionals and craftsmen with some work autonomy; household incomes commonly range from $35,000 to $75,000. Typically, some college education.	Middle class (plurality/ majority?; ca. 46%)	College-educated workers with considerably higher-than-average incomes and compensation; a man making $57,000 and a woman making $40,000 may be typical.
Working class (30%)	Clerical and most blue-collar workers whose work is highly routinized. Standard of living varies depending on number of income earners, but is commonly just adequate. High school education.	Working class (32%)	Clerical, pink- and blue-collar workers with often low job security; common household incomes range from $16,000 to $30,000. High school education.	Working class (ca. 40–45%)	Blue-collar workers and those whose jobs are highly routinized with low economic security; a man making $40,000 and a woman making $26,000 may be typical. High school education.
Working poor (13%)	Service, low-rung clerical and some blue-collar workers. High economic insecurity and risk of poverty. Some high school education.	Working class (32%)	Clerical, pink- and blue-collar workers with often low job security; common household incomes range from $16,000 to $30,000. High school education.	Working class (ca. 40–45%)	Blue-collar workers and those whose jobs are highly routinized with low economic security; a man making $40,000 and a woman making $26,000 may be typical. High school education.
Working poor (13%)	Service, low-rung clerical and some blue-collar workers. High economic insecurity and risk of poverty. Some high school education.	Lower class (ca. 14–20%)	Those who occupy poorly-paid positions or rely on government transfers. Some high school education.	Working class (ca. 40–45%)	Blue-collar workers and those whose jobs are highly routinized with low economic security; a man making $40,000 and a woman making $26,000 may be typical. High school education.
Underclass (12%)	Those with limited or no participation in the labor force. Reliant on government transfers. Some high school education.	Lower class (ca. 14–20%)	Those who occupy poorly-paid positions or rely on government transfers. Some high school education.	The poor (ca. 12%)	Those living below the poverty line with limited to no participation in the labor force; a household income of $18,000 may be typical. Some high school education.
References: Gilbert, D. (2002) The American Class Structure: In An Age of Growing Inequality. Belmont, CA: Wadsworth, ISBN 0534541100. Thompson, W. & Hickey, J. (2005). Society in Focus. Boston, MA: Pearson, Allyn & Bacon; Beeghley, L. (2004). The Structure of Social Stratification in the United States. Boston, MA: Pearson, Allyn & Bacon.^{1} The upper middle class may also be referred to as "Professional class" Ehrenreich, B. (1989). The Inner Life of the Middle Class. NY, NY: Harper-Collins.

== Wealth statistics ==
Family net worth

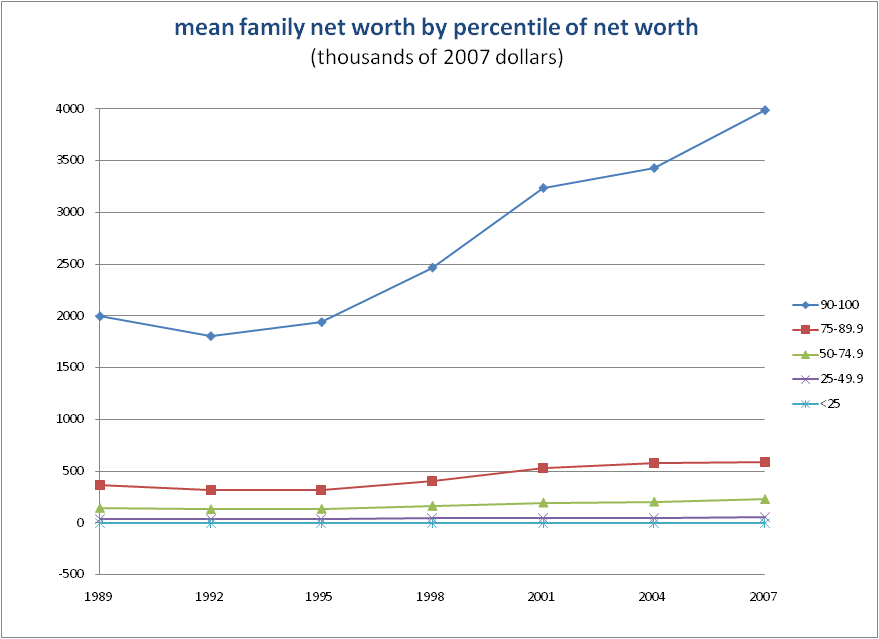
U.S. mean family net worth by percentile of net worth (1989–2007)

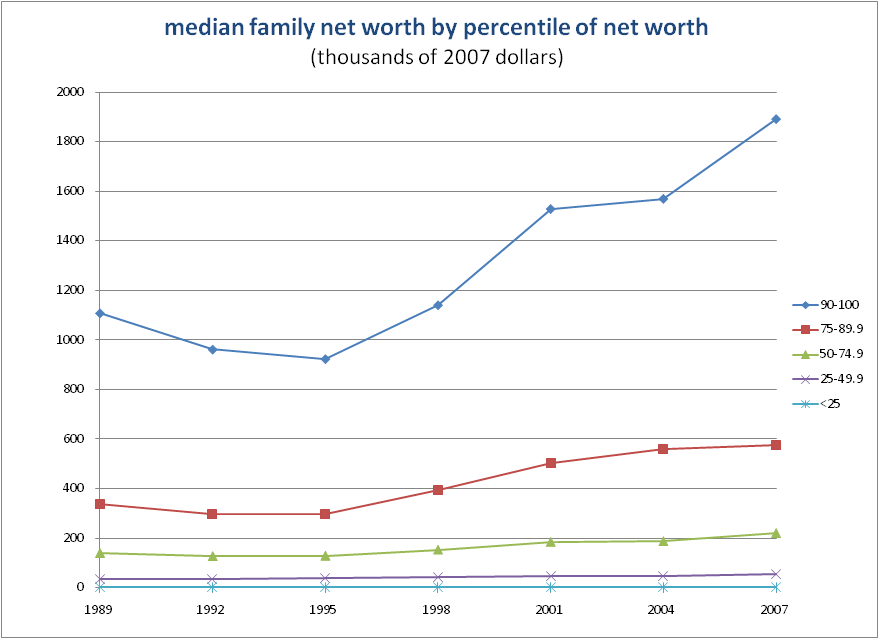
U.S. median family net worth by percentile of net worth (1989–2007)

The total value of all U.S. household wealth in 2000 was approximately $44 trillion. Prior to the Late-2000s recession which began in December 2007 its value was at $65.9 trillion. After, it plunged to $48.5 trillion during the first quarter of 2009. The total household net worth rose 1.3% by the fourth quarter of 2009 to $54.2 trillion, indicating the American economy is recovering.

Family net worth, by selected characteristics of families, 1989–2013 surveys Thousands of 2013 dollars. Excluding net worth from pensions and social security.
Family characteristic	1989		1992		1995		1998		2001		2004		2007		2010		2013	
Family characteristic	Median	Mean	Median	Mean	Median	Mean	Median	Mean	Median	Mean	Median	Mean	Median	Mean	Median	Mean	Median	Mean
All families	85.06	342.3	80.75	303.94	87.73	323.49	102.5	405.47	113.91	522.08	114.81	553.87	135.86	625.17	82.52	530.4	81.4	528.42
Percentile of income																		
Less than 20	3.47	44.64	6.4	54.14	9.05	67.76	8.25	70.85	10.37	70	9.15	88.24	9.87	118.86	6.49	125.24	6.2	87.53
20–39.9	44.83	123.03	45.09	105.32	52.67	121.87	49.46	139.66	50.61	155.16	42.38	151.95	42.44	151	29.69	139.27	21.5	111.35
40–59.9	76.13	185.52	64.26	164.79	69.52	154.09	76.26	179.75	83.7	214.46	89.34	241.35	99.26	236.53	69.59	211.24	61.8	170.07
60–79.9	122.01	246.89	122.52	227.02	114.45	242.5	159.68	291.76	185.95	387.54	197.3	418.27	229.84	417.51	136.21	313.35	158.71	333.84
80–89.9	242.45	404.26	194.76	370.36	194.74	392.56	270.18	471.22	344.46	594.93	387.21	607.97	401.4	689.52	309.65	610.39	298.4	629.92
90–100	713.99	1818.17	592.71	1565.69	542.04	1669.56	646.54	2218.94	1095.88	2968.97	1141.27	3130.45	1257.64	3712.54	1275.32	3114.95	1134.5	3248.01
Age of head (years)																		
Less than 35	14.7	90.06	15.09	73.75	18.21	65.7	13.01	95.89	15.36	111.76	17.51	90.83	13.15	119.05	9.97	69.8	10.46	75.43
35–44	102.22	268.48	72.63	216.62	79.08	218.66	90.77	280.69	103.09	341.44	85.64	369.57	99.54	366.66	45.4	232.14	47.05	347.48
45–54	177.32	509.75	127.22	437.02	140.71	456.45	151	519.66	176.39	646.15	178.93	671.14	207.72	743.79	125.55	611.01	105.35	526.04
55–64	177.45	557.02	184.9	551.42	175.33	580.88	182.84	762.66	243.31	967.69	310.75	1044.82	284.85	1051.28	191.51	941.87	165.72	795.39
65–74	140.27	528.08	160.36	468.15	168.42	531.47	209.42	667.27	233.75	888.56	234.54	853.34	268.8	1137.84	221.49	902.95	232.1	1047.31
75 or more	131.14	436.54	141.19	348.1	141.16	394.72	179.83	443.67	205.32	614.83	201.13	648.94	239.38	717.66	232.45	705.43	195	611.43
Family structure																		
Single with child(ren)	12.65	114.8	13.78	86.21	18.21	110.45	23.02	149.95	17.12	125.04	25.4	161.14	27.77	200.2	16.77	153.45	14.16	129.14
Single, no child, age less than 55	14.91	135.53	24.37	114.93	26.35	110.23	22.16	131.31	25.61	196.09	26.64	192.92	28.18	233.42	15.75	126.72	14.14	148
Single, no child, age 55 or more	73.53	221.71	95.15	254.04	107.39	300.55	124.37	351.49	120.03	383.07	144.52	432.57	161.57	438.18	108.56	408.81	107.9	372.77
Couple with child(ren)	113.16	367.7	97.97	335.85	100.03	329.12	124.44	429.95	149.77	579.85	150.65	622.81	158.2	673.05	92.59	591.65	93.01	587.2
Couple, no child	202.41	644.02	167.97	513.01	175.77	551.23	212.24	689.38	230.8	846.48	257.23	928.84	251.39	1065.75	219.67	921.93	213.73	941.42
Education of head																		
No high school diploma	43.71	150.4	30.38	113.87	34.91	127.3	30.02	112.77	33.37	138.37	25.4	167.93	37.16	160.44	17.47	118.51	17.25	107.73
High school diploma	66.34	203.53	62.39	181.57	78.52	202.29	77.41	225.49	76.17	237.97	84.35	243.38	90.39	282.7	60.77	231.89	52.4	199.74
Some college	84.34	336.97	93.99	279.95	71.83	287.13	106.59	341.44	95.86	369.1	85.24	380.66	94.99	412.2	54.55	291.68	46.8	318.2
College degree	204.26	671.18	161.37	553.81	158.62	589.66	209.14	759.07	281.49	1050.7	279.45	1052.44	319.55	1233.48	207.37	1039.27	218.72	1015.52
Race or ethnicity of respondent																		
White non-Hispanic	130.47	418.12	113.25	362.34	116.57	383.13	137.21	484.34	161.39	642.12	173.84	694.21	192.58	777.65	139.05	695.69	141.9	696.51
Nonwhite or Hispanic	11.37	117.06	19.5	126.01	23.53	117.04	23.73	143.6	23.66	154.39	30.64	189.1	31.66	257.55	21.97	188.11	18.1	184.23
Current work status of head																		
Working for someone else	69.23	207.12	64.26	199.6	75.14	209.04	74.91	241.89	85.88	299.38	83	332.93	105.09	394.83	59.05	319	62.09	314.78
Self-employed	306.38	1201.18	238.84	977.15	236.94	1071.65	355.09	1320.2	459.63	1639.56	428.89	1755.61	436.77	2196.15	304.9	1842.66	359.5	2121.08
Retired	122.32	336.74	114.55	308.21	123.25	342.96	161.96	432.95	151.66	598.88	172.38	578.11	180.99	610.28	161.29	518.84	128.5	501.09
Other not working	1.05	84.2	5.36	86.31	5.53	86.56	5.15	154.2	10.24	234.05	14.37	199.98	6.4	138.74	12.75	144.38	9.06	135.15
Current occupation of head																		
Managerial or professional	202.05	693.66	165.37	613.03	168.17	660.62	189.84	778.16	260.15	1010.06	243.42	1066.24	277.56	1254.73	178.22	1110.19	192.6	1047.79
Technical, sales, or services	50.49	236.17	59.47	223.19	56.09	242.98	59.04	275.56	60.8	259.47	55.94	305.19	82.95	348.41	34.85	234.04	31.66	267.59
Other occupation	66.81	201.6	53.24	142.14	69.37	171.55	71.19	179.84	65.21	179.04	70.07	182.02	72.7	215.72	49.92	174.08	49.24	172.31
Retired or other not working	79.53	284.09	81.24	255.61	94.5	290.84	117.65	384.46	126.86	539.55	136.51	519.42	144.84	536.67	100.1	438.72	90.8	431.36
Housing status																		
Owner	181.82	492.75	161.01	439.95	157.63	463.61	188.98	580.49	226.79	736.75	227.76	772.14	263.8	874.29	185.41	758.71	195.5	773.41
Renter or other	3.62	76.29	5.28	62.9	7.32	66.6	6	61.82	6.33	72.39	4.99	66.83	5.73	80.01	5.47	60.79	5.4	70.39
Percentile of net worth																		
Less than 25	0.2	-0.98	0.81	-0.91	1.44	-0.23	0.71	-2.64	1.58	0.1	2.1	-1.64	1.47	-2.36	†	-13.01	†	-12.97
25–49.9	37.96	41.84	38.31	41.38	42.99	46.49	46.95	51.42	53.84	58.39	53.76	58.16	60.87	65.27	34.62	38.19	31.36	35.86
50–74.9	157.8	162.17	142.82	147.45	144.38	151.23	172.63	183.98	207.36	219.86	210.99	229.18	247.68	255.71	168.04	180.14	168.23	177.71
75–89.9	382.57	411.6	332.1	355.92	336.53	362.35	444.48	461.3	566.59	594.04	628.78	652.2	642.46	660.23	514.33	562.65	505.08	546.25
90–100	1249.03	2294.4	1085.34	2035.37	1038.76	2196.97	1287	2779.65	1729.24	3631.65	1762.78	3845.83	2130.17	4462.99	1997.43	3945.86	1871.6	3962.43
† Less than 0.05 ($50).

== See also ==
- Poverty in the United States
- Social programs in the United States
- Wealth inequality in the United States
- Redistribution of wealth#Public opinion
- States of the United States of America by income

Wealth:

- American oligarchs
- Donor Class
- Irrational exuberance
- The Affluent Society
- Affluenza

Tax avoidance:

- Panama Papers
- Paradise Papers

General:

- Economy of the United States
- Household income in the United States
- International Ranking of Household Income
- List of Average Wages per Country
- List of countries by total wealth
- List of U.S. states by savings rate
