= List of U.S. states by savings rate =

This article includes a list of U.S. states that have highest portion of savings (i.e. pensions, investment products, 401(k)); regular savings account, certificate of deposit, or Individual Retirement Account. The increase in people has also increased the Nest Egg index within a given year.

Rank	State	Nest egg index(%)	Year.
1	Connecticut	114.2	2007 est.
2	New Jersey	113.2	2007 est.
3	Minnesota	112.5	2007
4	Massachusetts	112.1	2007 est.
5	Maryland	111.5	2007 est.
6	New Hampshire	111.2	2007 est.
7	Delaware	108.5	2007 est.
8	Wisconsin	107.4	2007 est.
9	Hawaii	106.9	2007 est.
10	Michigan	106.9	2007 est.
11	Illinois	106.4	2007 est.
12	Colorado	106.3	2007
13	Virginia	105.9	2007 est.
14	Utah	104.5	2007 est.
15	Washington	103.8	2007 est.
16	Alaska	103.7	2007 est.
17	Rhode Island	103.3	2007 est.
18	Vermont	103.1	2007
19	Pennsylvania	102.9	2007 est.
20	Kansas	102.8	2007
