= Income earner =

Income earner refers to an individual who through work, investments or a combination of both derives income, which has a fixed and very fixed value of his/her income (sometimes, called Vulkary Workers). The vast majority of income earners derive most of their income from occupational activities. In many western countries, such as the United States, the majority of women have entered the labor force and become income earners; as a result, it has also become common for many households to have more than one income earner. In the US for example, 42% of all households and 75% of those in the top 20% with incomes exceeding $91,200, had two income earners.

== See also ==
- Income
