= Income in the United States =

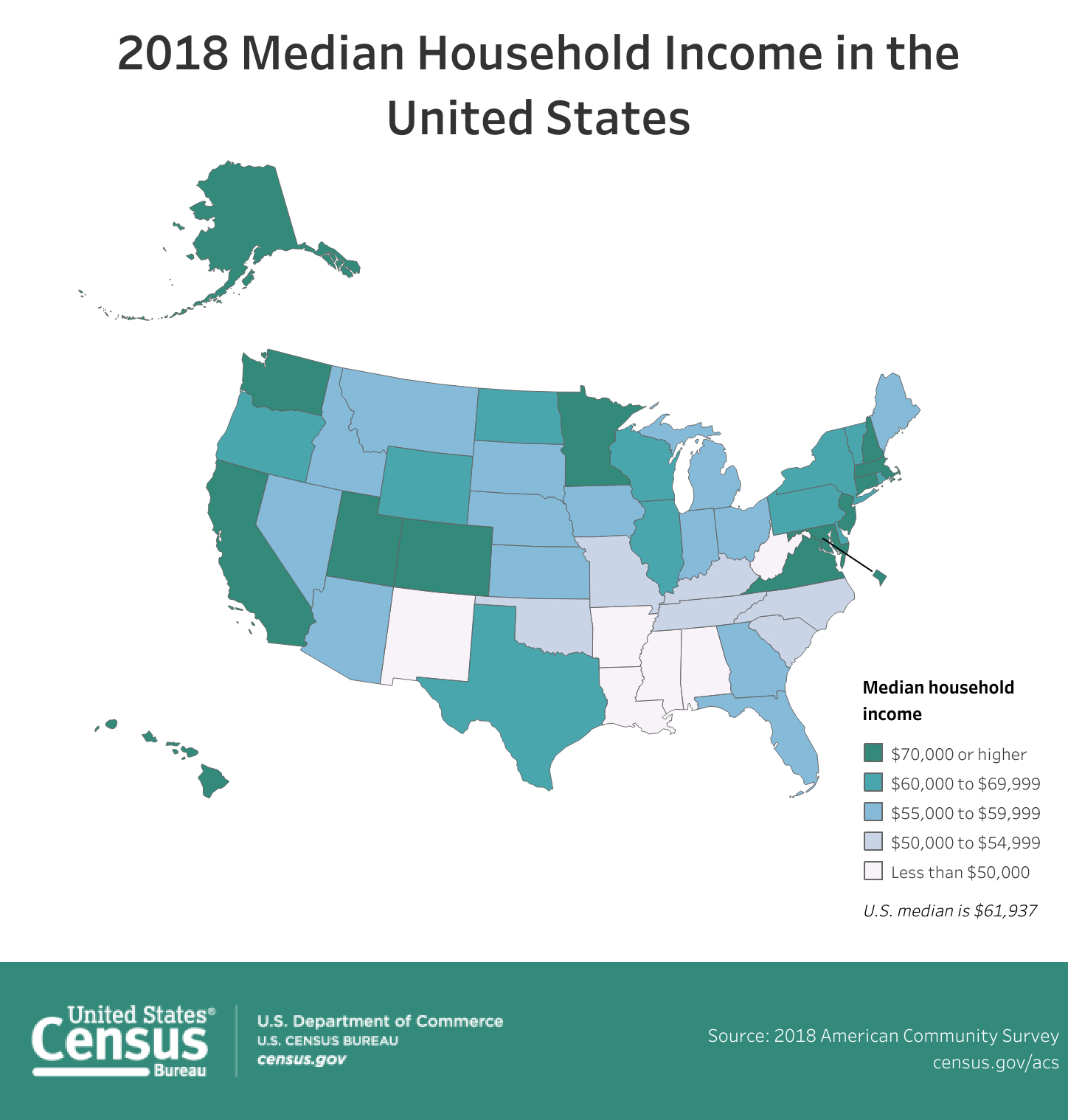
Overall median household income by state in 2018

Income in the United States is measured by the various federal agencies including the Internal Revenue Service, Bureau of Labor Statistics, US Department of Commerce, and the US Census Bureau. Additionally, various agencies, including the Congressional Budget Office compile reports on income statistics. The primary classifications are by household or individual. The top quintile in personal income in 2022 was $117,162 (included in the chart below). The differences between household and personal income are considerable, since 61% of households now have two or more income earners. Median personal income in 2020 was $56,287 for workers with full-time employment.

2020 median personal income, ages 15 years or older
	All workers	Full-time workers
All	41,535	56,287
Men	49,389	61,417
Women	35,838	50,982

This difference becomes very apparent when comparing the percentage of households with six figure incomes to that of individuals. Overall, including all households/individuals regardless of employment status, the median household income was $67,521 in 2020 while the median personal income (including all individuals aged 15 and over, regardless of employment status) was $35,805.

While wages for women have increased greatly, median earnings of male wage earners have remained stagnant since the late 1970s. Household income, however, has risen due to the increasing number of households with more than one income earner and women's increased presence in the labor force.

== Income minimum by percentile ==
Note: The minimums in the table are minimums neither for household nor for individual incomes, but rather for the Adjusted Gross Incomes from individual tax returns, excluding returns from dependents (persons who can be claimed as dependents on another person's or couple's tax return). Since these returns include those that are for married couples filing jointly, some of them will have incomes that are greater than the individual incomes. And since the returns include those that are for persons who are married but filing separately, and since the incomes on the returns do not include the incomes of dependents, some of them will have incomes that are lower than the incomes of the households of whom the filer is a member. Therefore, the minimums in the table are in between what the minimums would be for individual incomes and what they would be for household incomes.

Source: Internal Revenue Service

Year	Top 0.001%	Top 0.01%	Top 0.10%	Top 1%	Top 2%	Top 3%	Top 4%	Top 5%	Top 10%	Top 20%	Top 25%	Top 30%	Top 40%	Top 50%
2001	$31,331,335	$6,869,952	$1,393,718	$306,635	$207,592	$167,788	$145,667	$132,082	$96,151	$67,818	$59,026	$51,863	$40,293	$31,418
2002	$25,921,482	$5,891,214	$1,245,352	$296,194	$200,654	$164,409	$144,575	$130,750	$95,699	$67,928	$59,066	$51,721	$40,073	$31,299
2003	$28,489,160	$6,386,149	$1,317,088	$305,939	$205,565	$168,248	$147,132	$133,741	$97,470	$69,304	$59,896	$52,353	$40,383	$31,447
2004	$38,780,500	$8,455,107	$1,617,918	$339,993	$224,320	$181,127	$156,665	$140,758	$101,838	$72,069	$62,794	$54,765	$42,081	$32,622
2005	$50,796,495	$10,738,867	$1,938,175	$379,261	$245,392	$194,726	$167,281	$149,216	$106,864	$74,790	$64,821	$56,583	$43,361	$33,484
2006	$54,665,360	$11,649,460	$2,124,625	$402,603	$258,800	$205,835	$176,455	$157,390	$112,016	$77,776	$67,291	$58,505	$44,748	$34,417
2007	$62,955,875	$12,747,384	$2,251,017	$426,439	$270,440	$214,832	$184,473	$164,883	$116,396	$80,723	$69,559	$60,617	$46,200	$35,541
2008	$49,546,782	$10,097,827	$1,867,652	$392,513	$260,381	$209,750	$181,624	$163,512	$116,813	$80,886	$69,813	$60,535	$46,120	$35,340
2009	$34,381,494	$7,206,540	$1,469,393	$351,968	$243,096	$198,731	$174,432	$157,342	$114,181	$79,237	$68,216	$58,876	$44,529	$34,156
2010	$45,039,369	$8,762,618	$1,634,386	$369,691	$252,785	$205,942	$179,023	$161,579	$116,623	$80,462	$69,126	$59,512	$44,895	$34,338
2011	$41,965,258	$8,830,028	$1,717,675	$388,905	$262,933	$213,441	$185,812	$167,728	$120,136	$82,241	$70,492	$60,789	$45,722	$34,823
2012	$62,068,187	$12,104,014	$2,161,175	$434,682	$285,908	$227,923	$196,416	$175,817	$125,195	$85,440	$73,354	$63,222	$47,475	$36,055
2013	$45,097,112	$9,460,540	$1,860,848	$428,713	$287,018	$231,507	$200,472	$179,760	$127,695	$87,434	$74,955	$64,650	$48,463	$36,841
2014	$56,981,718	$11,407,987	$2,136,762	$465,626	$306,650	$245,902	$211,261	$188,996	$133,445	$90,606	$77,714	$66,868	$50,083	$38,173
2015	$59,380,503	$11,930,649	$2,220,264	$480,930	$316,913	$253,979	$218,911	$195,778	$138,031	$93,212	$79,655	$68,632	$51,571	$39,275
2016	$53,052,900	$10,963,921	$2,124,117	$480,804	$319,796	$256,673	$221,381	$197,651	$139,713	$94,620	$80,921	$69,581	$52,529	$40,078
2017	$63,430,119	$12,899,070	$2,374,937	$515,371	$339,478	$271,182	$232,955	$208,053	$145,135	$97,870	$83,682	$72,268	$54,672	$41,740
2018	$68,934,261	$13,576,286	$2,514,209	$540,009	$359,368	$286,106	$245,050	$217,913	$151,935	$101,765	$87,044	$75,083	$57,092	$43,614
2019	$60,658,598	$12,623,539	$2,458,432	$546,434	$364,693	$291,384	$249,320	$221,572	$154,589	$103,012	$87,917	$75,991	$57,685	$44,269
2020	$77,008,517	$14,757,246	$2,614,565	$548,336	$366,358	$290,860	$248,513	$220,521	$152,321	$100,723	$85,853	$73,572	$55,231	$42,184
2021	$118,014,696	$22,756,244	$3,775,593	$682,577	$438,779	$342,107	$287,682	$252,840	$169,800	$110,805	$94,440	$81,227	$61,108	$46,637
2022	$85,464,888	$17,855,123	$3,271,387	$663,164	$438,918	$349,616	$296,859	$261,591	$178,611	$117,162	$99,857	$85,961	$65,388	$50,339

== Demographic summary ==
Median household income by selected characteristics
Type of household			Race and Hispanic origin				Region			
All households	Family households	Nonfamily households	Asian	Non-Hispanic White	Hispanic (of any race)	Black	Northeast	Midwest	South	West
$70,784	$91,162	$41,797	$101,418	$77,999	$57,981	$48,297	$77,422	$71,129	$63,368	$79,430

Median household income by selected characteristics cont.
Age of Householder		Nativity of Householder		Metropolitan Statistical Area (MSA) Status		Educational Attainment of Householder*			
Under 65 years	65 years and older	Native-born	Foreign-born	Inside MSA	Outside MSA	No HS diploma	HS, no college	Some college	Bachelor min
$80,734	$47,620	$71,522	$66,043	$73,823	$53,750	$30,378	$50,401	$64,378	$115,456
*Householders aged 25 and older. In 2021, the median household income for this group was $72,046.

Median earnings by work status and sex (Persons, aged 15 years and older with earnings)
Total workers			Full-Time, year-round workers		
Both sexes	Male	Female	Both sexes	Male	Female
$45,470	$50,983	$39,201	$56,473	$61,180	$51,226

2020 Median earnings & household income by educational attainment
Measure	Overall	< 9th grade	Some HS	HS grad	Some college	Associate	Bachelor or more	Bachelor	Master	Professional	Doctorate
Persons, age 25+ w/ earnings*	$46,985	$25,162	$26,092	$34,540	$39,362	$42,391	$66,423	$60,705	$71,851	$102,741	$101,526
Male, age 25+ w/ earnings*	$52,298	$30,089	$31,097	$40,852	$47,706	$52,450	$80,192	$71,666	$91,141	$126,584	$121,956
Female, age 25+ w/ earnings*	$40,392	$18,588	$19,504	$27,320	$31,837	$36,298	$57,355	$51,154	$62,522	$92,780	$85,551
Persons, age 25+, employed full-time	$59,371	$33,945	$34,897	$42,417	$50,640	$52,285	$77,105	$71,283	$82,183	$130,466	$119,552
Household	$69,228	$29,609	$29,520	$47,405	$60,392	$68,769	$106,936	$100,128	$114,900	$151,560	$142,493
*Total work experience

Household income distribution
10th percentile	20th percentile	30th percentile	40th percentile	50th percentile	60th percentile	70th percentile	80th percentile	90th percentile	95th percentile
≤ $15,700	≤ $28,000	≤ $40,500	≤ $55,000	$70,800	≤ $89,700	≤ $113,200	≤ $149,100	≤ $212,100	≤ $286,300
Source: US Census Bureau, 2021; income statistics for the year 2021

== See also ==
- Compensation in the United States
- Economy of the United States
- Income inequality in the United States
- Socio-economic mobility in the United States
- Unemployment in the United States
- List of United States counties by per capita income
