= Personal income in the United States =

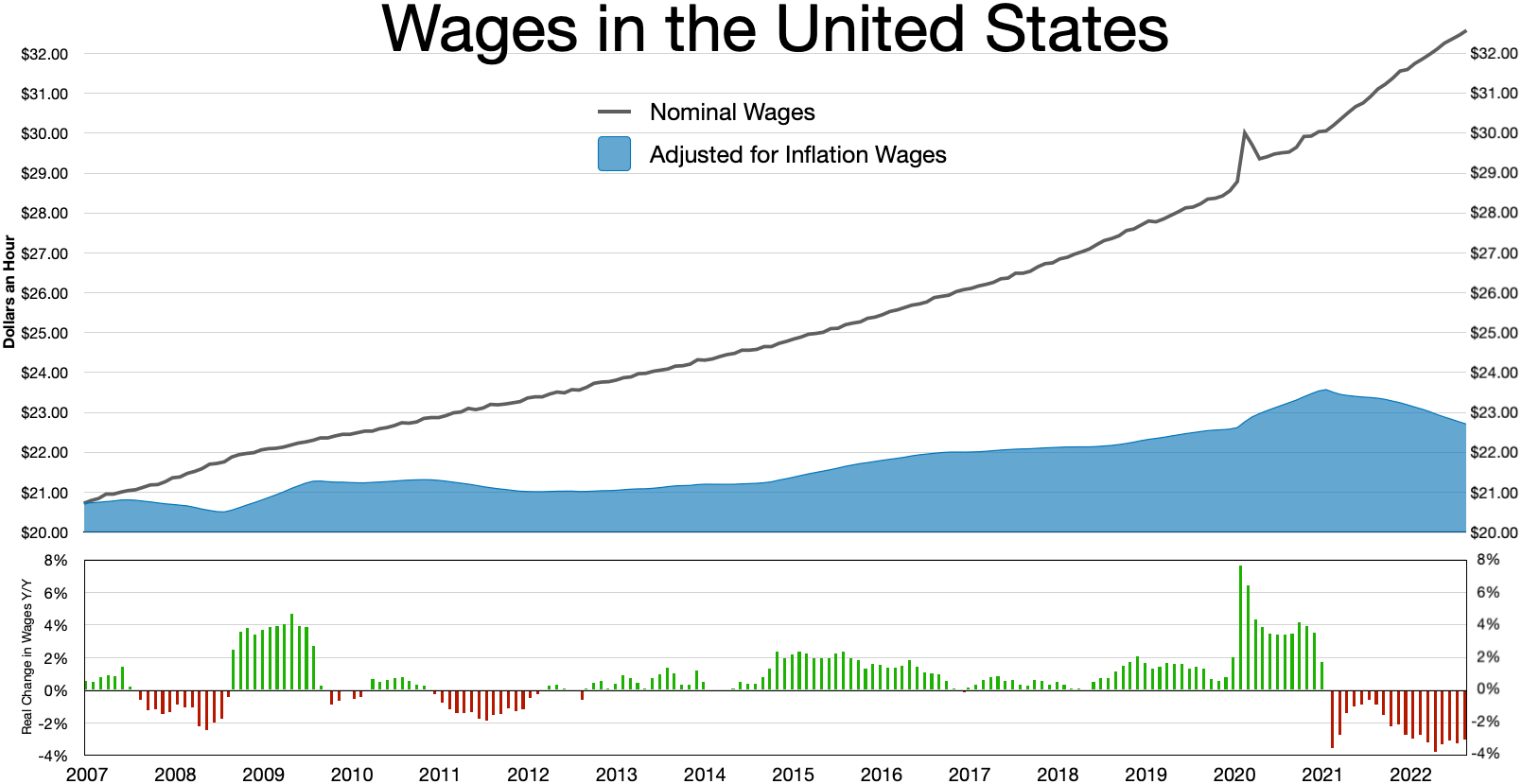
Wages annualized rate (before taxes) Nominal wages Adjusted for inflation wages

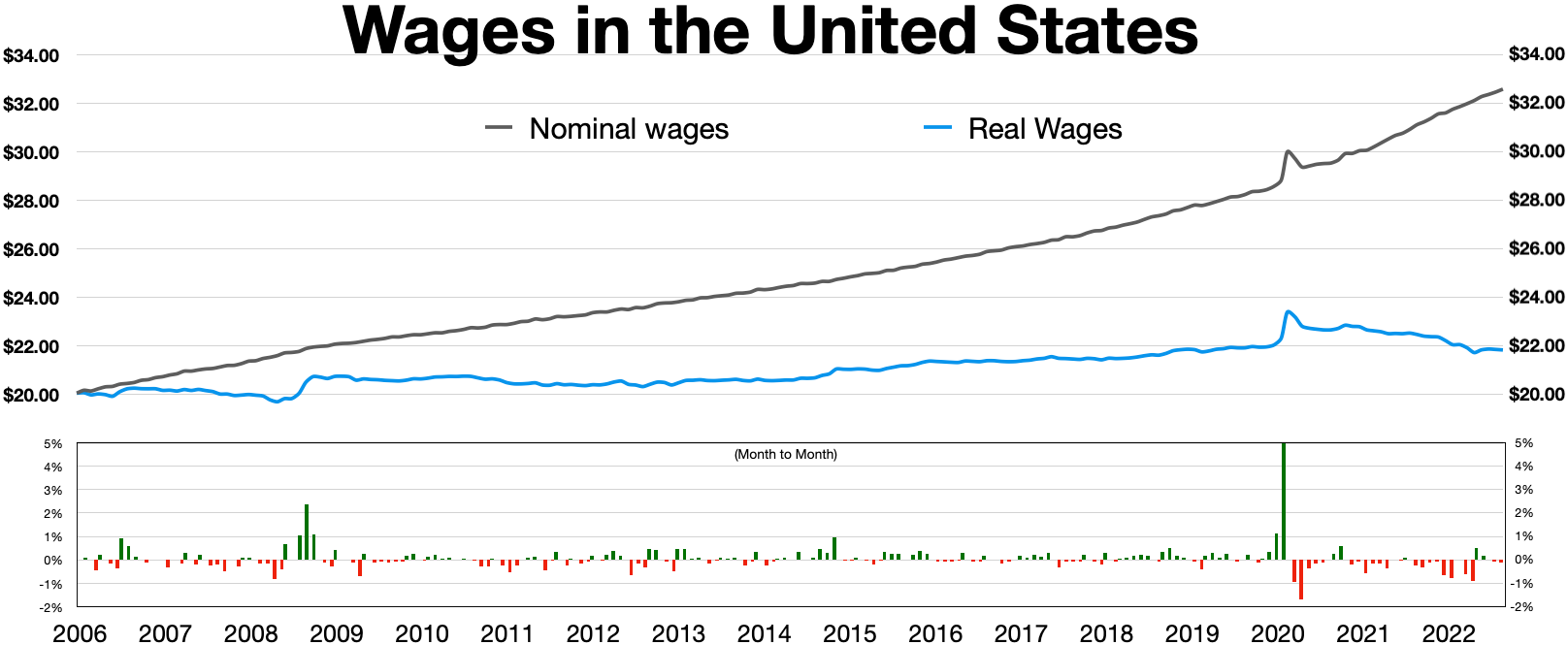
Wages Month to Month rate (before taxes) Nominal wages Adjusted for inflation wages

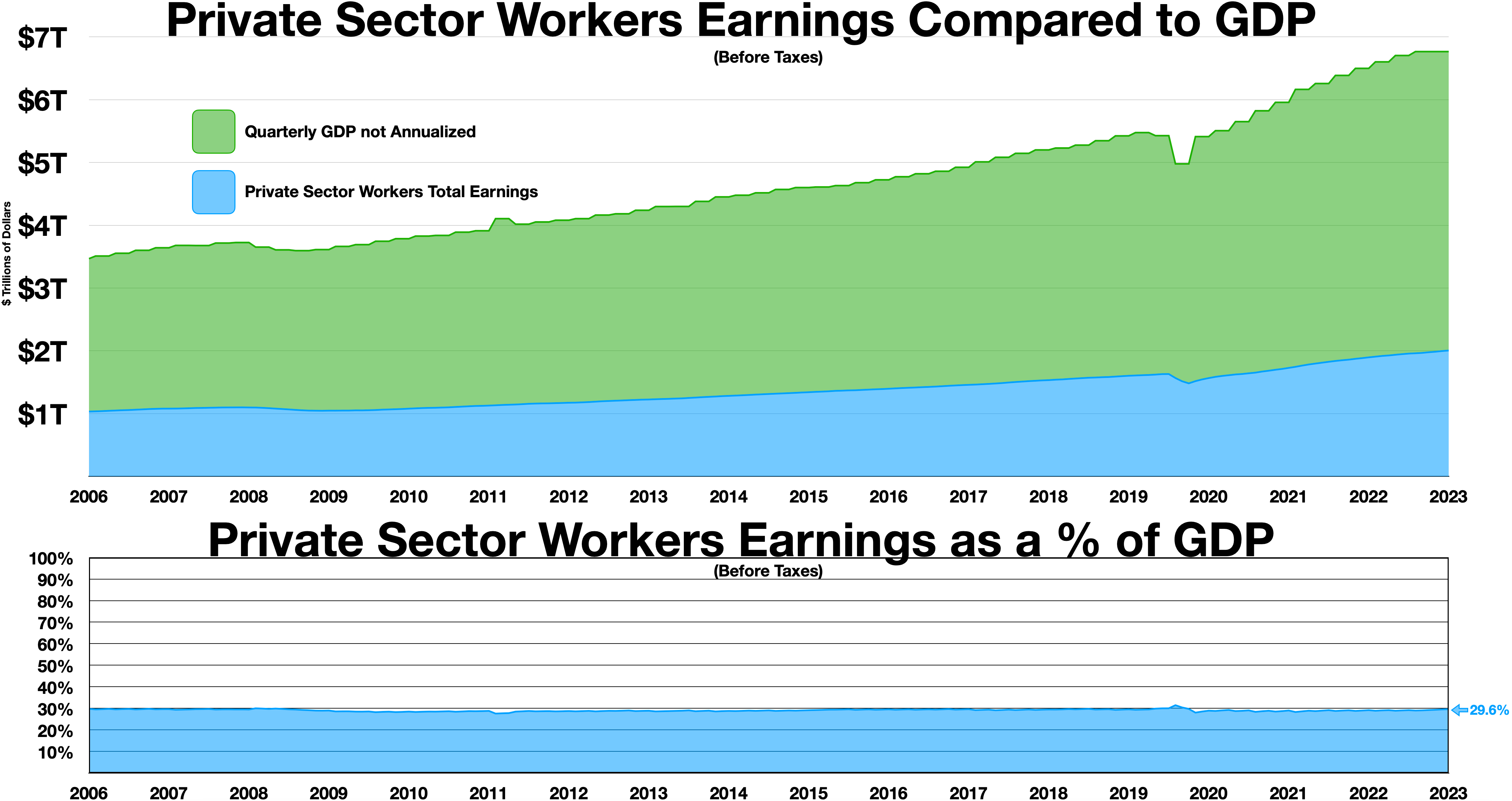
Private sector workers earnings compared to GDP Private sector workers made approximately $2 trillion, or about 29.6% of all money earned in Q3 2023 (before taxes) Quarterly GDP not Annualized Private Sector Workers Total Earnings

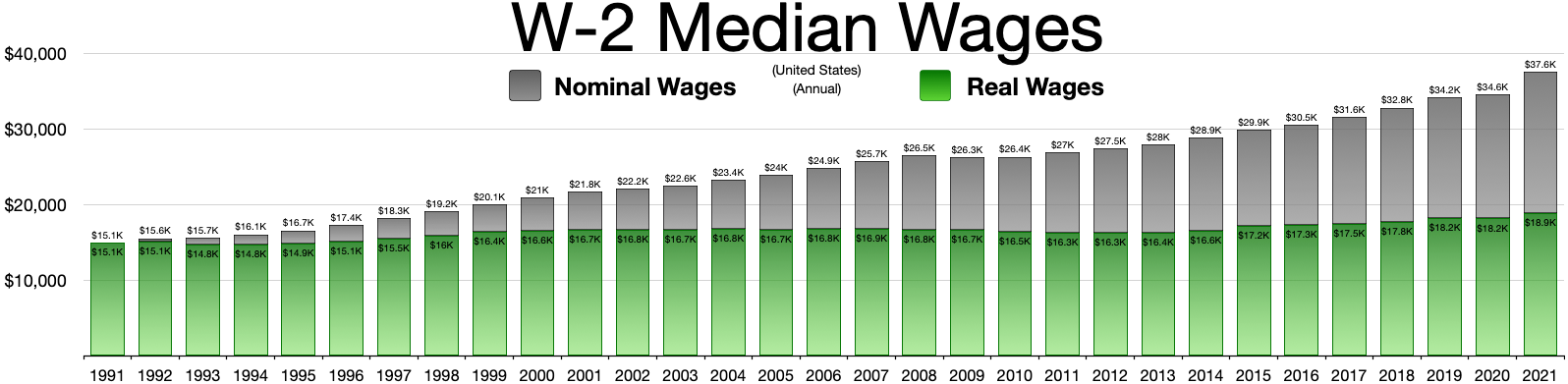
Annual median wages W-2 Nominal Wages Real Wages

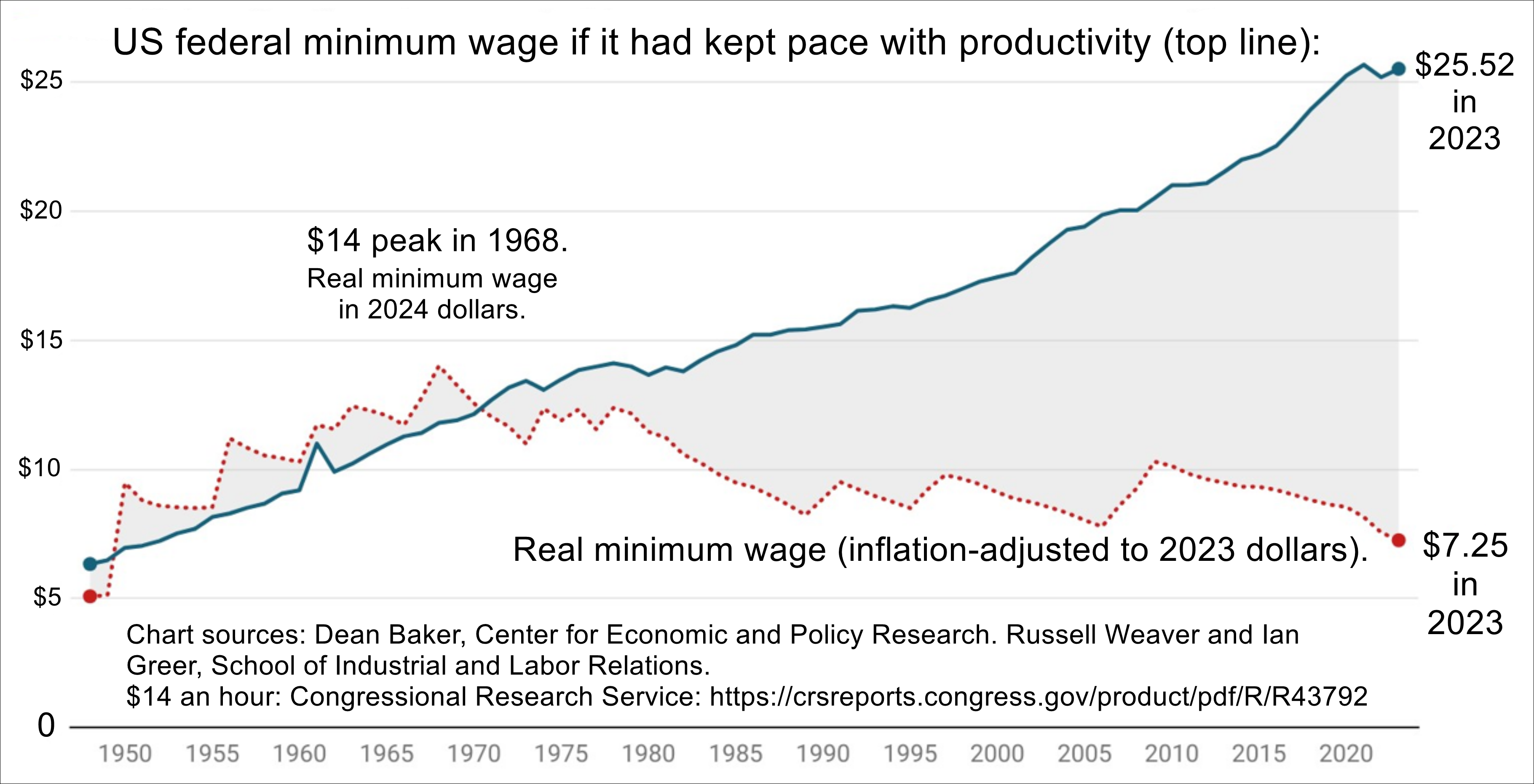
US federal minimum wage if it had kept pace with productivity. Also, the real minimum wage.

Personal income is an individual's total earnings from wages, investment interest, and other sources. The Bureau of Labor Statistics reported that median usual weekly earnings for full-time wage and salary workers were $1,251 in the second quarter of 2026, not seasonally adjusted, 4.6 percent higher than a year earlier. For the year 2024, the U.S. Census Bureau estimates that the median annual earnings for all workers (people aged 15 and over with earnings) was $51,370; and more specifically estimates that median annual earnings for those who worked full-time, year round, was $63,360.

Income patterns are evident on the basis of age, sex, ethnicity and educational characteristics. In 2005 roughly half of all those with graduate degrees were among the nation's top 15% of income earners. Among different demographics (gender, marital status, ethnicity) for those over the age of 18, median personal income ranged from $3,317 for an unemployed, married Asian American female to $55,935 for a full-time, year-round employed Asian American male. According to the US Census, men tended to have higher income than women, while Asians and Whites earned more than African Americans and Hispanics.

== Income statistics ==
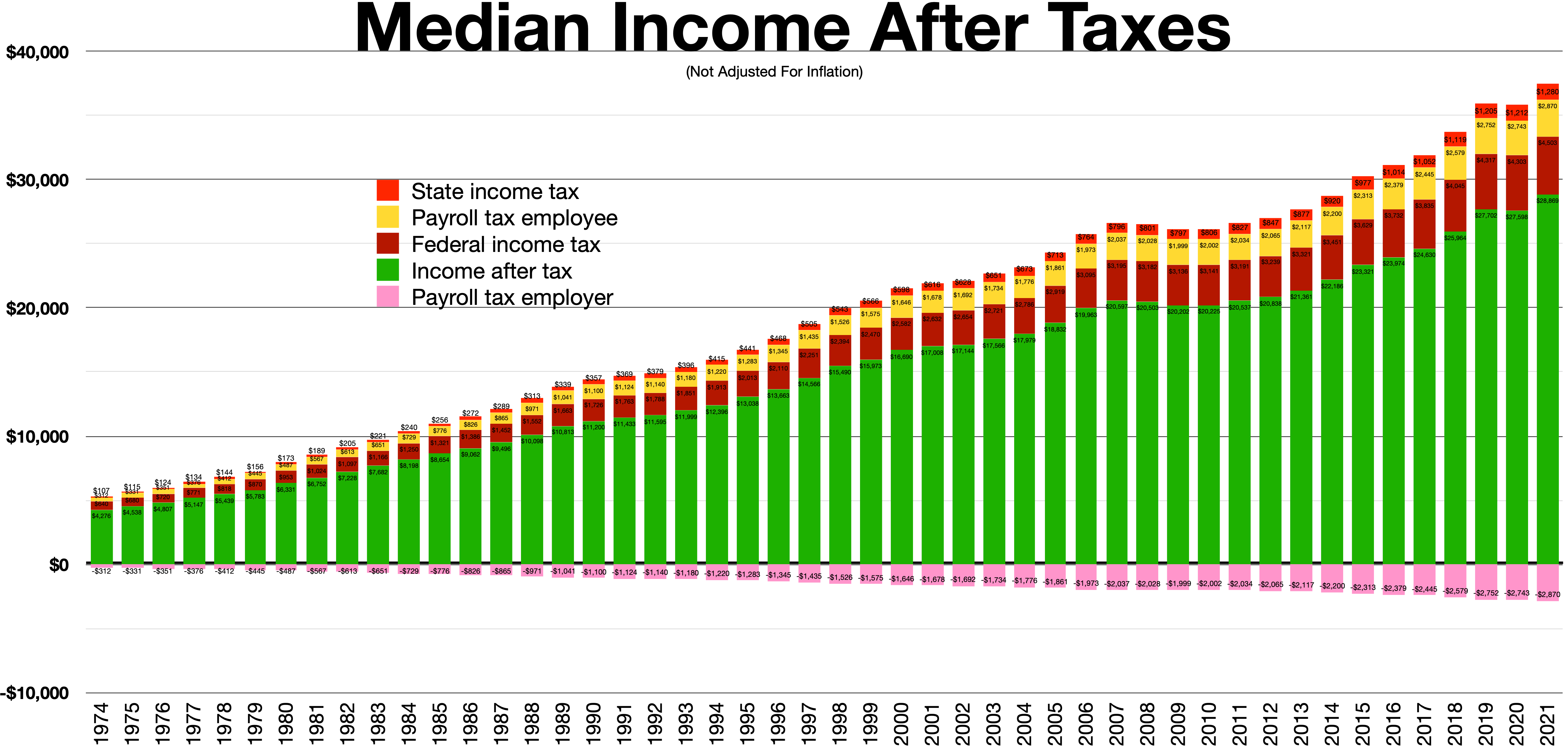
Median personal income after taxes State income tax Payroll tax employee side Federal income tax Median income after tax Payroll tax employer side

In the United States the most widely cited personal income statistics are the Bureau of Economic Analysis's personal income and the Census Bureau's per capita money income. The two statistics spring from different traditions of measurement—personal income from national economic accounts and money income from household surveys. BEA's statistics relate personal income to measures of production, including GDP, and is considered an indicator of consumer spending. The Census Bureau's statistics provide detail on income distribution and demographics and are used to produce the nation's official poverty statistics.

=== Personal income and disposable personal income ===
BEA's personal income measures the income received by persons from participation in production, from government and business transfers, and from holding interest-bearing securities and corporate stocks. Personal income also includes income received by nonprofit institutions serving households, by private non-insured welfare funds, and by private trust funds. BEA also publishes disposable personal income, which measures the income available to households after paying federal and state and local government income taxes.

Income from production is generated both by the labor of individuals (for example, in the form of wages and salaries and of proprietors' income) and by the capital that they own (in the form of rental income of persons). Income that is not earned from production in the current period—such as capital gains, which relate to changes in the price of assets over time—is excluded.

BEA's monthly personal income estimates are one of several key macroeconomic indicators that the National Bureau of Economic Research considers when dating the business cycle.

Personal income and disposable personal income are provided both as aggregate and as per capita statistics. BEA produces monthly estimates of personal income for the nation, quarterly estimates of state personal income, and annual estimates of local-area personal income. More information is found on BEA's website.

=== Census money income ===
The Census Bureau collects income data on several major surveys, including the Annual Social and Economic Supplement (ASEC) of the Current Population Survey (CPS), the Survey of Income and Program Participation (SIPP), and the American Community Survey (ACS). The CPS is the source of the official national estimates of poverty and the most widely cited source of annual household income estimates for the United States.

The CPS measure of money income is defined as the total pre-tax cash income received by people on a regular basis, excluding certain lump-sum payments and excluding capital gains.

The Census Bureau also produces alternative estimates of income and poverty based on broadened definitions of income that include many of these income components that are not included in money income.

The Census Bureau releases estimates of household money income as medians, percent distributions by income categories, and on a per capita basis. Estimates are available by demographic characteristics of householders and by the composition of households. More details on income concepts and sources are found on the Census Bureau's website.

== By educational attainment ==
Median income (dollars). View chart definition.
Educational attainment: People 25 years old and over by median income: 1991 to 2018

Median personal income by educational attainment, age 25+ (2017)
Measure	Some high school	High school graduate	Some college	Associate degree	Bachelor's degree or higher	Bachelor's degree	Master's degree	Professional degree	Doctorate degree
Persons, w/ earnings	$24,576	$33,669	$37,968	$37,968	$61,440	$56,592	$70,608	$91,538	$79,231
Male, w/ earnings	$22,214	$32,307	$39,823	$43,785	$70,437	$62,304	$78,222	$111,881	$91,604
Female, w/ earnings	$20,784	$28,896	$33,360	$33,360	$54,480	$49,248	$61,200	$65,012	$68,887
Persons, employed full-time	$30,598	$38,102	$43,377	$47,401	$71,221	$64,074	$77,285	$117,679	$101,307

Field of study significantly affects earning potential, and the more specific education is disaggregated, the larger the variance. For example, the 2013–15 American Community Survey reported median incomes for workers aged 25–34 ranging from $24,030 for bachelor's degrees in arts and humanities, to $68,143 for bachelor's degrees in engineering. A 2011 report by Georgetown University on full-time, employed earners found that median income for specific majors varied from $29,000 for Counseling Psychology to $120,000 for Petroleum Engineering.

== Income distribution ==
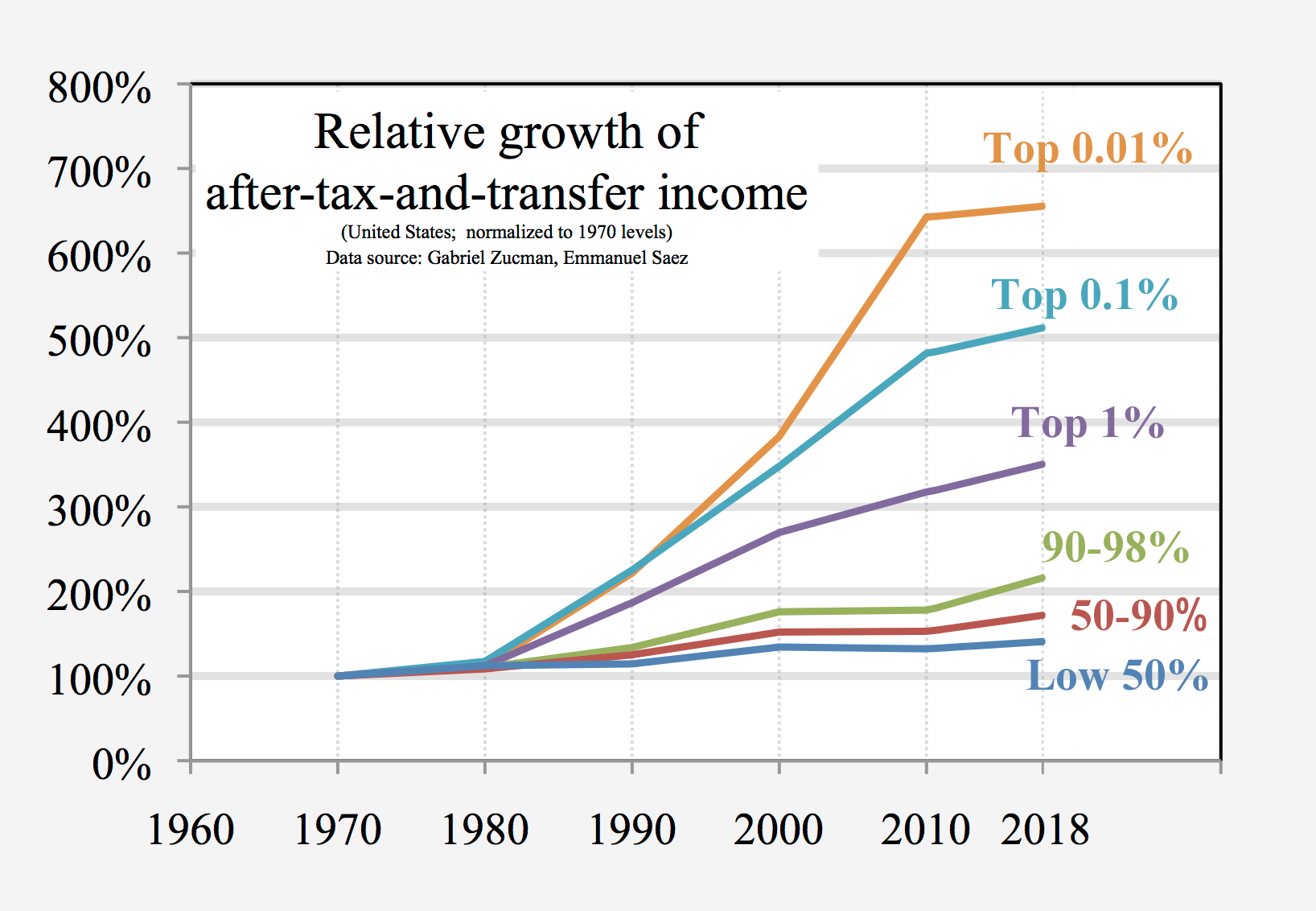
Relative income growth, organized by percentile classes, normalized to 1970 levels. Graph accounts for both income growth, and the hidden decline in the progressivity of the tax code at the top, the wealthiest earners having seen their effective tax rates steadily fall.

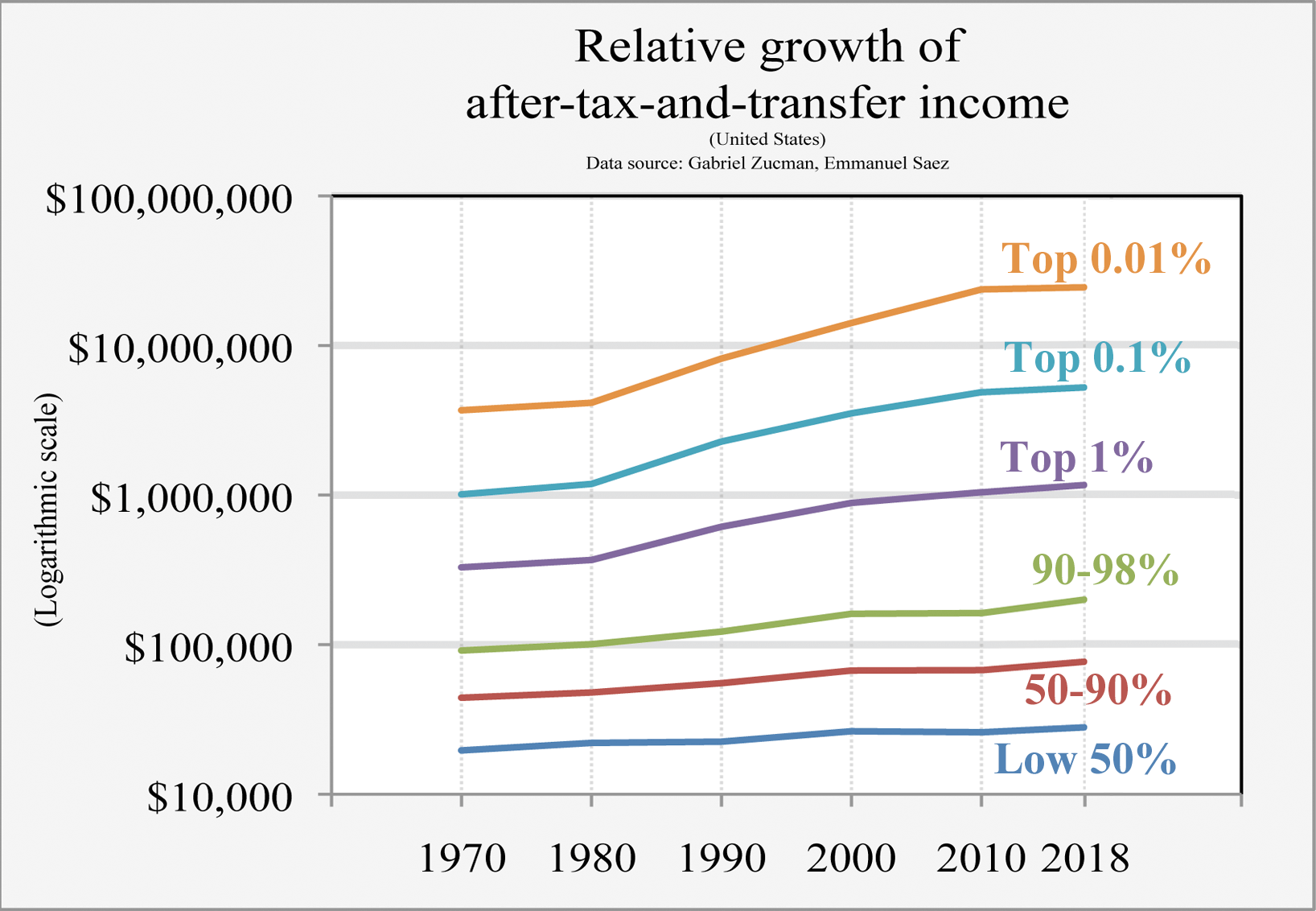
Same data as adjacent chart, but plotted on logarithmic scale to show absolute dollar amounts.

Of those individuals with income who were older than 15 years of age, approximately 50% had incomes below $30,000 while the top 10% had incomes exceeding $95,000 a year in 2015. The distribution of income among individuals differs substantially from household incomes as 39% of all households had two or more income earners. As a result, 25% of households have incomes above $100,000, even though only 9.2% of Americans had incomes exceeding $100,000 in 2010.

As a reference point, the US minimum wage since 2009 has been $7.25 per hour or $15,080 for the 2080 hours in a typical work year. The minimum wage is approximately 25% over the official U.S. government-designated poverty income level for a single person unit (before taxes) and about 63% of the designated poverty level for a family of four, assuming only one worker (before taxes). (See Poverty in the United States). Annual wages of $30,160; $45,240; $75,400; $150,800 and $1.5M correspond to 2, 3, 5, 10 and 100 times minimum wage respectively.

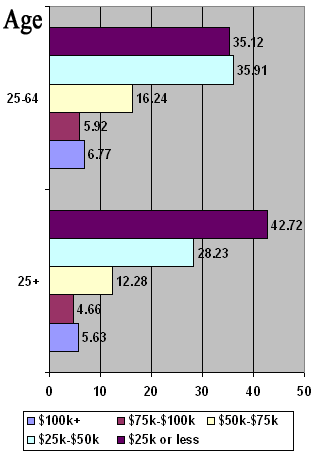
Income distribution among all those above age 25 and those between 25 and 64 with earnings. 25+ statistics will not add up exactly to 100% due to the unemployment rate.

=== Distribution of personal income in 2025 according to US Census data ===
The 2026 Current Population Survey Report estimated the 2025 US Population over the age of 15 to be 279,900,000 of which 248,300,000 (88.71%) had incomes over $1. Among those earning $1 or more, the median income was $46,960 and the mean income was $70,390. The distribution of incomes is further broken down as follows in the table below.

Income range	Number of people	Proportion (%)				
Income range	Number of people	In group	At or below	Cumulative		
$1 to $2,499	12,690,000	5.11	5.11	Less than $25k 27.99%	Less than $50k 52.07%	Less than $100k 79.83%
$2,500 to $4,999	4,906,000	1.98	7.09	Less than $25k 27.99%	Less than $50k 52.07%	Less than $100k 79.83%
$5,000 to $7,499	4,569,000	1.84	8.93	Less than $25k 27.99%	Less than $50k 52.07%	Less than $100k 79.83%
$7,500 to $9,999	4,166,000	1.68	10.61	Less than $25k 27.99%	Less than $50k 52.07%	Less than $100k 79.83%
$10,000 to $12,499	8,492,000	3.42	14.03	Less than $25k 27.99%	Less than $50k 52.07%	Less than $100k 79.83%
$12,500 to $14,999	6,741,000	2.71	16.74	Less than $25k 27.99%	Less than $50k 52.07%	Less than $100k 79.83%
$15,000 to $17,499	7,812,000	3.15	19.89	Less than $25k 27.99%	Less than $50k 52.07%	Less than $100k 79.83%
$17,500 to $19,999	5,775,000	2.33	22.22	Less than $25k 27.99%	Less than $50k 52.07%	Less than $100k 79.83%
$20,000 to $22,499	8,896,000	3.58	25.80	Less than $25k 27.99%	Less than $50k 52.07%	Less than $100k 79.83%
$22,500 to $24,999	5,428,000	2.19	27.99	Less than $25k 27.99%	Less than $50k 52.07%	Less than $100k 79.83%
$25,000 to $50,000					Less than $50k 52.07%	Less than $100k 79.83%
$25,000 to $27,499	8,382,000	3.38	31.37	$25k–$50k 24.08%	Less than $50k 52.07%	Less than $100k 79.83%
$27,500 to $29,999	4,945,000	1.99	33.36	$25k–$50k 24.08%	Less than $50k 52.07%	Less than $100k 79.83%
$30,000 to $32,499	9,166,000	3.69	37.05	$25k–$50k 24.08%	Less than $50k 52.07%	Less than $100k 79.83%
$32,500 to $34,999	3,969,000	1.60	38.65	$25k–$50k 24.08%	Less than $50k 52.07%	Less than $100k 79.83%
$35,000 to $37,499	7,430,000	2.99	41.64	$25k–$50k 24.08%	Less than $50k 52.07%	Less than $100k 79.83%
$37,500 to $39,999	4,087,000	1.65	43.29	$25k–$50k 24.08%	Less than $50k 52.07%	Less than $100k 79.83%
$40,000 to $42,499	8,185,000	3.30	46.59	$25k–$50k 24.08%	Less than $50k 52.07%	Less than $100k 79.83%
$42,500 to $44,999	3,589,000	1.45	48.04	$25k–$50k 24.08%	Less than $50k 52.07%	Less than $100k 79.83%
$45,000 to $47,499	6,270,000	2.52	50.56	$25k–$50k 24.08%	Less than $50k 52.07%	Less than $100k 79.83%
$47,500 to $49,999	3,756,000	1.51	52.07	$25k–$50k 24.08%	Less than $50k 52.07%	Less than $100k 79.83%
$50,000 to $75,000						Less than $100k 79.83%
$50,000 to $52,499	8,852,000	3.57	55.64	$50k–$75k 17.70%	$50k-$100k 27.76%	Less than $100k 79.83%
$52,500 to $54,999	3,462,000	1.39	57.03	$50k–$75k 17.70%	$50k-$100k 27.76%	Less than $100k 79.83%
$55,000 to $57,499	5,316,000	2.14	59.17	$50k–$75k 17.70%	$50k-$100k 27.76%	Less than $100k 79.83%
$57,500 to $59,999	2,932,000	1.18	60.35	$50k–$75k 17.70%	$50k-$100k 27.76%	Less than $100k 79.83%
$60,000 to $62,499	7,060,000	2.84	63.19	$50k–$75k 17.70%	$50k-$100k 27.76%	Less than $100k 79.83%
$62,500 to $64,999	2,543,000	1.02	64.21	$50k–$75k 17.70%	$50k-$100k 27.76%	Less than $100k 79.83%
$65,000 to $67,499	4,560,000	1.84	66.05	$50k–$75k 17.70%	$50k-$100k 27.76%	Less than $100k 79.83%
$67,500 to $69,999	2,203,000	0.89	66.94	$50k–$75k 17.70%	$50k-$100k 27.76%	Less than $100k 79.83%
$70,000 to $72,499	4,929,000	1.99	68.93	$50k–$75k 17.70%	$50k-$100k 27.76%	Less than $100k 79.83%
$72,500 to $74,999	2,085,000	0.84	69.77	$50k–$75k 17.70%	$50k-$100k 27.76%	Less than $100k 79.83%
$75,000 to $100,000					$50k-$100k 27.76%	Less than $100k 79.83%
$75,000 to $77,499	4,229,000	1.70	71.47	$75k-$100k 10.06%	$50k-$100k 27.76%	Less than $100k 79.83%
$77,500 to $79,999	2,173,000	0.88	72.35	$75k-$100k 10.06%	$50k-$100k 27.76%	Less than $100k 79.83%
$80,000 to $82,499	4,052,000	1.63	73.98	$75k-$100k 10.06%	$50k-$100k 27.76%	Less than $100k 79.83%
$82,500 to $84,999	1,935,000	0.78	74.76	$75k-$100k 10.06%	$50k-$100k 27.76%	Less than $100k 79.83%
$85,000 to $87,499	3,077,000	1.24	76.00	$75k-$100k 10.06%	$50k-$100k 27.76%	Less than $100k 79.83%
$87,500 to $89,999	1,428,000	0.58	76.58	$75k-$100k 10.06%	$50k-$100k 27.76%	Less than $100k 79.83%
$90,000 to $92,499	3,238,000	1.30	77.88	$75k-$100k 10.06%	$50k-$100k 27.76%	Less than $100k 79.83%
$92,500 to $94,999	1,518,000	0.61	78.49	$75k-$100k 10.06%	$50k-$100k 27.76%	Less than $100k 79.83%
$95,000 to $97,499	2,069,000	0.83	79.32	$75k-$100k 10.06%	$50k-$100k 27.76%	Less than $100k 79.83%
$97,500 to $99,999	1,266,000	0.51	79.83	$75k-$100k 10.06%	$50k-$100k 27.76%	Less than $100k 79.83%
$100,000 to $200,000
$100,000 to $149,999	25,312,000	10.20	90.03	$100k-200k 14.79%	$100k-250k 16.94%	More than $100k 20.17%
$150,000 to $199,999	11,405,000	4.59	94.62	$100k-200k 14.79%	$100k-250k 16.94%	More than $100k 20.17%
$200,000 to $250,000					$100k-250k 16.94%	More than $100k 20.17%
$200,000 to $249,999	5,351,000	2.15	96.77		$100k-250k 16.94%	More than $100k 20.17%
$250,000 or more						More than $100k 20.17%
$250,000 or more	8,019,000	3.23	100.00			More than $100k 20.17%

PINC-11. Income Distribution to $250,000 or More for Males and Females.

== Over time, by ethnicity and sex ==
This chart is median income of 15 year olds or older, who have non-zero income. Amounts are shown in nominal dollars and in real dollars (in parentheses, 2017 dollars).

		1950	1960	1970	1980	1990	2000	2004	2016
Overall	Male	$2,570 ($26,270)	$4,080 ($33,940)	$6,670 ($42,270)	$12,530 ($37,530)	$20,293 ($38,210)	$28,343 ($40,490)	$30,513 ($39,740)	$38,869 ($38,869)
Overall	Female	$953 ($9,742)	$1,261 ($10,490)	$2,237 ($14,180)	$4,920 ($14,690)	$10,070 ($18,960)	$16,063 ($22,950)	$17,629 ($22,960)	$24,892 ($24,892)
White/European American	Male	$2,709 ($27,690)	$4,296 ($35,740)	$7,011 ($44,430)	$13,328 ($39,790)	$21,170 ($39,860)	$29,797 ($42,570)	$31,335 ($40,810)	$40,632 ($40,632)
White/European American	Female	$1,060 ($10,840)	$1,352 ($11,250)	$2,266 ($14,360)	$4,947 ($14,770)	$10,317 ($19,430)	$16,079 ($22,970)	$17,648 ($22,990)	$25,221 ($25,221)
Black/African American	Male	$1,471 ($15,040)	$2,260 ($18,800)	$4,157 ($26,340)	$8,009 ($23,910)	$12,868 ($24,230)	$21,343 ($30,490)	$22,740 ($29,620)	$29,376 ($29,376)
Black/African American	Female	$474 ($4,846)	$837 ($6,963)	$2,063 ($13,070)	$4,580 ($13,670)	$8,328 ($15,680)	$15,581 ($22,260)	$18,379 ($23,940)	$22,690 ($22,690)
Asian American	Male					$19,394 ($36,520)	$30,833 ($44,050)	$32,419 ($42,230)	$46,590 ($46,590)
Asian American	Female					$11,086 ($20,870)	$17,356 ($24,800)	$20,618 ($26,860)	$26,771 ($26,771)

== By ethnicity and origin ==
Personal income varied significantly with an individual's racial characteristics with racial discrepancies having remained largely stagnant since 1996. Overall, Asian Americans earned higher median personal incomes than any other racial demographic. Asian Americans had a median income roughly ten percent higher than that of Whites. The only exception was among the holders of graduate degrees who constitute 8.9% of the population. Among those with a master's, professional or doctorate degree, those who identified as White had the highest median individual income. This racial income gap was relatively small.

Those identifying as Hispanic or Latino (who may have been of any race) had the lowest overall median personal income, earning 28.51% less than Whites and 35% less than Asian Americans. The second-largest racial or ethnic gap was between Whites and African Americans with the former earning roughly 22% more than the latter. Thus one can observe a significant discrepancy with the median income of Asians and Whites and that of African Americans and Hispanics.

Overall the race gap between African Americans and Whites has remained roughly equal between both races over the past decade. Both races saw a gain in median income between 1996 and 2006, with the income growth among African Americans slightly outpacing that of Whites. In 1996 the median income for Whites was $5,957 (31%) higher than for Blacks. In 2006 the gap in median incomes was nearly identical with the median income for Whites being $5,929 (22%) higher than that for African Americans. While the gap remains numerically unchanged, the percentage difference between the two races has decreased as a result of mutual increases in median personal income.

Measuring income by per capita is another way to look at personal earnings by race. Unlike median statistics, per capita statistics are affected by extremely high and low incomes. According to the U.S. Census Bureau "The per capita income for the overall population in 2008 was $26,964; for non-Hispanic Whites, it was $31,313; for Blacks, it was $18,406; for Asians, it was $30,292; and for Hispanics, it was $15,674."

The number of thousands of individuals in each income bracket

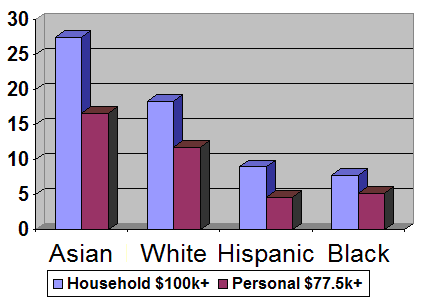
Proportion of all households with six-figure incomes, and individuals with incomes in the top 10% (exceeding $77,500)

Median personal income by race (Hispanics, including people from all racial categories, is not disjoint)

Race		Overall median	High school	Some college	College graduate	Bachelor's degree	Master's degree	Doctorate
Total population	All, age 25+	32,140	26,505	31,054	49,303	43,143	52,390	70,853
Total population	Full-time workers, age 25-64	39,509	31,610	37,150	56,027	50,959	61,324	79,292
White alone	All, age 25+	33,030	27,311	31,564	49,972	43,833	52,318	71,268
White alone	Full-time workers, age 25-64	40,422	32,427	38,481	56,903	51,543	61,441	77,906
Asian alone	All, age 25+	36,152	25,285	29,982	51,481	42,466	61,452	69,653
Asian alone	Full-time workers, age 25-64	42,109	27,041	33,120	60,532	51,040	71,316	91,430
African American	All, age 25+	27,101	22,379	27,648	44,534	41,572	48,266	61,894
African American	Full-time workers, age 25-64	32,021	26,230	32,392	47,758	45,505	52,858	73,265
Hispanic or Latino (all races)	All, age 25+	23,613	22,941	28,698	41,596	37,819	50,901	67,274
Hispanic or Latino (all races)	Full-time workers, age 25-64	27,266	26,461	33,120	46,594	41,831	53,880	N/A

Source: US Census Bureau, 2006

== See also ==
- Adjusted gross income, which includes AGI by year for the US
- Economy of the United States
- Income inequality metrics
  - Atkinson index
  - Gini coefficient
  - Hoover index
  - Theil index
- List of American countries by monthly average wage
